

547001–547100 

|-bgcolor=#fefefe
| 547001 ||  || — || June 4, 2003 || Kitt Peak || Spacewatch ||  || align=right data-sort-value="0.76" | 760 m || 
|-id=002 bgcolor=#fefefe
| 547002 ||  || — || March 24, 2003 || Kitt Peak || Spacewatch ||  || align=right data-sort-value="0.98" | 980 m || 
|-id=003 bgcolor=#d6d6d6
| 547003 ||  || — || May 14, 2005 || Mount Lemmon || Mount Lemmon Survey ||  || align=right | 1.9 km || 
|-id=004 bgcolor=#d6d6d6
| 547004 ||  || — || January 11, 2010 || Kitt Peak || Spacewatch ||  || align=right | 3.4 km || 
|-id=005 bgcolor=#d6d6d6
| 547005 ||  || — || February 12, 2010 || Socorro || LINEAR ||  || align=right | 3.4 km || 
|-id=006 bgcolor=#fefefe
| 547006 ||  || — || January 11, 2010 || Kitt Peak || Spacewatch || H || align=right data-sort-value="0.75" | 750 m || 
|-id=007 bgcolor=#fefefe
| 547007 ||  || — || January 24, 2006 || Kitt Peak || Spacewatch ||  || align=right data-sort-value="0.82" | 820 m || 
|-id=008 bgcolor=#d6d6d6
| 547008 ||  || — || April 4, 2005 || Mount Lemmon || Mount Lemmon Survey ||  || align=right | 2.5 km || 
|-id=009 bgcolor=#d6d6d6
| 547009 ||  || — || February 10, 2010 || Kitt Peak || Spacewatch ||  || align=right | 3.1 km || 
|-id=010 bgcolor=#d6d6d6
| 547010 ||  || — || January 11, 2010 || Kitt Peak || Spacewatch ||  || align=right | 3.1 km || 
|-id=011 bgcolor=#d6d6d6
| 547011 ||  || — || February 2, 2005 || Kitt Peak || Spacewatch ||  || align=right | 3.9 km || 
|-id=012 bgcolor=#d6d6d6
| 547012 ||  || — || August 18, 2002 || Palomar || NEAT ||  || align=right | 3.3 km || 
|-id=013 bgcolor=#d6d6d6
| 547013 ||  || — || February 13, 2010 || Mount Lemmon || Mount Lemmon Survey ||  || align=right | 2.9 km || 
|-id=014 bgcolor=#fefefe
| 547014 ||  || — || November 3, 2005 || Mount Lemmon || Mount Lemmon Survey ||  || align=right data-sort-value="0.67" | 670 m || 
|-id=015 bgcolor=#d6d6d6
| 547015 ||  || — || February 13, 2010 || Mount Lemmon || Mount Lemmon Survey ||  || align=right | 2.4 km || 
|-id=016 bgcolor=#d6d6d6
| 547016 ||  || — || February 13, 2010 || Mount Lemmon || Mount Lemmon Survey ||  || align=right | 3.7 km || 
|-id=017 bgcolor=#d6d6d6
| 547017 ||  || — || September 21, 2008 || Kitt Peak || Spacewatch ||  || align=right | 2.3 km || 
|-id=018 bgcolor=#fefefe
| 547018 ||  || — || February 13, 2010 || Catalina || CSS ||  || align=right data-sort-value="0.91" | 910 m || 
|-id=019 bgcolor=#d6d6d6
| 547019 ||  || — || February 13, 2010 || Mount Lemmon || Mount Lemmon Survey ||  || align=right | 2.2 km || 
|-id=020 bgcolor=#fefefe
| 547020 ||  || — || February 13, 2010 || Mount Lemmon || Mount Lemmon Survey ||  || align=right data-sort-value="0.93" | 930 m || 
|-id=021 bgcolor=#d6d6d6
| 547021 ||  || — || January 8, 2010 || Mount Lemmon || Mount Lemmon Survey ||  || align=right | 3.2 km || 
|-id=022 bgcolor=#d6d6d6
| 547022 ||  || — || February 13, 2010 || Mount Lemmon || Mount Lemmon Survey ||  || align=right | 2.5 km || 
|-id=023 bgcolor=#fefefe
| 547023 ||  || — || September 6, 2008 || Kitt Peak || Spacewatch ||  || align=right data-sort-value="0.72" | 720 m || 
|-id=024 bgcolor=#d6d6d6
| 547024 ||  || — || January 11, 2010 || Mount Lemmon || Mount Lemmon Survey ||  || align=right | 3.3 km || 
|-id=025 bgcolor=#d6d6d6
| 547025 ||  || — || February 14, 2010 || Mount Lemmon || Mount Lemmon Survey ||  || align=right | 2.2 km || 
|-id=026 bgcolor=#d6d6d6
| 547026 ||  || — || January 17, 2010 || Kitt Peak || Spacewatch ||  || align=right | 2.5 km || 
|-id=027 bgcolor=#d6d6d6
| 547027 ||  || — || February 14, 2010 || Mount Lemmon || Mount Lemmon Survey ||  || align=right | 2.5 km || 
|-id=028 bgcolor=#d6d6d6
| 547028 ||  || — || February 14, 2010 || Mount Lemmon || Mount Lemmon Survey ||  || align=right | 2.7 km || 
|-id=029 bgcolor=#d6d6d6
| 547029 ||  || — || October 31, 2008 || Kitt Peak || Spacewatch ||  || align=right | 2.9 km || 
|-id=030 bgcolor=#d6d6d6
| 547030 ||  || — || February 14, 2010 || Mount Lemmon || Mount Lemmon Survey ||  || align=right | 2.3 km || 
|-id=031 bgcolor=#d6d6d6
| 547031 ||  || — || September 27, 2008 || Mount Lemmon || Mount Lemmon Survey ||  || align=right | 2.4 km || 
|-id=032 bgcolor=#d6d6d6
| 547032 ||  || — || February 14, 2010 || Mount Lemmon || Mount Lemmon Survey || 7:4 || align=right | 3.4 km || 
|-id=033 bgcolor=#d6d6d6
| 547033 ||  || — || February 14, 2010 || Mount Lemmon || Mount Lemmon Survey ||  || align=right | 3.0 km || 
|-id=034 bgcolor=#d6d6d6
| 547034 ||  || — || January 11, 2010 || Kitt Peak || Spacewatch ||  || align=right | 3.2 km || 
|-id=035 bgcolor=#d6d6d6
| 547035 ||  || — || October 10, 2008 || Kitt Peak || Spacewatch ||  || align=right | 1.7 km || 
|-id=036 bgcolor=#d6d6d6
| 547036 ||  || — || January 11, 2010 || Kitt Peak || Spacewatch ||  || align=right | 2.3 km || 
|-id=037 bgcolor=#fefefe
| 547037 ||  || — || February 14, 2010 || Mount Lemmon || Mount Lemmon Survey ||  || align=right data-sort-value="0.75" | 750 m || 
|-id=038 bgcolor=#d6d6d6
| 547038 ||  || — || February 14, 2010 || Mount Lemmon || Mount Lemmon Survey ||  || align=right | 2.4 km || 
|-id=039 bgcolor=#d6d6d6
| 547039 ||  || — || February 14, 2010 || Mount Lemmon || Mount Lemmon Survey ||  || align=right | 2.5 km || 
|-id=040 bgcolor=#d6d6d6
| 547040 ||  || — || April 30, 2006 || Kitt Peak || Spacewatch ||  || align=right | 2.8 km || 
|-id=041 bgcolor=#d6d6d6
| 547041 ||  || — || February 14, 2010 || Mount Lemmon || Mount Lemmon Survey ||  || align=right | 2.1 km || 
|-id=042 bgcolor=#fefefe
| 547042 ||  || — || February 14, 2010 || Kitt Peak || Spacewatch ||  || align=right data-sort-value="0.63" | 630 m || 
|-id=043 bgcolor=#d6d6d6
| 547043 ||  || — || February 14, 2010 || Catalina || CSS ||  || align=right | 3.2 km || 
|-id=044 bgcolor=#d6d6d6
| 547044 ||  || — || September 12, 2007 || Mount Lemmon || Mount Lemmon Survey ||  || align=right | 2.6 km || 
|-id=045 bgcolor=#d6d6d6
| 547045 ||  || — || November 1, 2008 || Kitt Peak || Spacewatch ||  || align=right | 2.1 km || 
|-id=046 bgcolor=#d6d6d6
| 547046 ||  || — || December 20, 2009 || Mount Lemmon || Mount Lemmon Survey ||  || align=right | 2.1 km || 
|-id=047 bgcolor=#fefefe
| 547047 ||  || — || February 14, 2010 || Mount Lemmon || Mount Lemmon Survey ||  || align=right data-sort-value="0.66" | 660 m || 
|-id=048 bgcolor=#d6d6d6
| 547048 ||  || — || September 14, 2007 || Mount Lemmon || Mount Lemmon Survey ||  || align=right | 2.3 km || 
|-id=049 bgcolor=#d6d6d6
| 547049 ||  || — || September 13, 2007 || Mount Lemmon || Mount Lemmon Survey ||  || align=right | 2.9 km || 
|-id=050 bgcolor=#d6d6d6
| 547050 ||  || — || September 12, 2007 || Mount Lemmon || Mount Lemmon Survey ||  || align=right | 2.3 km || 
|-id=051 bgcolor=#d6d6d6
| 547051 ||  || — || February 14, 2010 || Mount Lemmon || Mount Lemmon Survey ||  || align=right | 2.3 km || 
|-id=052 bgcolor=#fefefe
| 547052 ||  || — || February 14, 2010 || Mount Lemmon || Mount Lemmon Survey || MAS || align=right data-sort-value="0.71" | 710 m || 
|-id=053 bgcolor=#d6d6d6
| 547053 ||  || — || September 13, 2007 || Mount Lemmon || Mount Lemmon Survey ||  || align=right | 3.0 km || 
|-id=054 bgcolor=#fefefe
| 547054 ||  || — || January 21, 2002 || Kitt Peak || Spacewatch ||  || align=right data-sort-value="0.78" | 780 m || 
|-id=055 bgcolor=#d6d6d6
| 547055 ||  || — || February 15, 2010 || Mount Lemmon || Mount Lemmon Survey ||  || align=right | 3.0 km || 
|-id=056 bgcolor=#d6d6d6
| 547056 ||  || — || February 15, 2010 || Mount Lemmon || Mount Lemmon Survey ||  || align=right | 2.4 km || 
|-id=057 bgcolor=#d6d6d6
| 547057 ||  || — || February 15, 2010 || Kitt Peak || Spacewatch ||  || align=right | 3.2 km || 
|-id=058 bgcolor=#d6d6d6
| 547058 ||  || — || February 15, 2010 || Mount Lemmon || Mount Lemmon Survey ||  || align=right | 2.9 km || 
|-id=059 bgcolor=#fefefe
| 547059 ||  || — || February 7, 2010 || La Sagra || OAM Obs. || H || align=right data-sort-value="0.65" | 650 m || 
|-id=060 bgcolor=#d6d6d6
| 547060 ||  || — || April 7, 2005 || Siding Spring || SSS ||  || align=right | 4.4 km || 
|-id=061 bgcolor=#fefefe
| 547061 ||  || — || February 6, 2010 || Mount Lemmon || Mount Lemmon Survey ||  || align=right data-sort-value="0.73" | 730 m || 
|-id=062 bgcolor=#fefefe
| 547062 ||  || — || February 9, 2010 || Kitt Peak || Spacewatch ||  || align=right data-sort-value="0.59" | 590 m || 
|-id=063 bgcolor=#d6d6d6
| 547063 ||  || — || February 13, 2010 || Mount Lemmon || Mount Lemmon Survey || Tj (2.94) || align=right | 3.4 km || 
|-id=064 bgcolor=#d6d6d6
| 547064 ||  || — || September 21, 2008 || Mount Lemmon || Mount Lemmon Survey ||  || align=right | 2.6 km || 
|-id=065 bgcolor=#E9E9E9
| 547065 ||  || — || February 13, 2010 || Kitt Peak || Spacewatch ||  || align=right | 1.2 km || 
|-id=066 bgcolor=#d6d6d6
| 547066 ||  || — || February 13, 2010 || Mount Lemmon || Mount Lemmon Survey ||  || align=right | 3.3 km || 
|-id=067 bgcolor=#d6d6d6
| 547067 ||  || — || March 8, 2005 || Anderson Mesa || LONEOS ||  || align=right | 3.4 km || 
|-id=068 bgcolor=#fefefe
| 547068 ||  || — || October 19, 2008 || Kitt Peak || Spacewatch ||  || align=right data-sort-value="0.76" | 760 m || 
|-id=069 bgcolor=#d6d6d6
| 547069 ||  || — || January 11, 2010 || Mount Lemmon || Mount Lemmon Survey ||  || align=right | 2.9 km || 
|-id=070 bgcolor=#d6d6d6
| 547070 ||  || — || February 14, 2010 || Kitt Peak || Spacewatch ||  || align=right | 2.2 km || 
|-id=071 bgcolor=#fefefe
| 547071 ||  || — || September 19, 2008 || Kitt Peak || Spacewatch ||  || align=right data-sort-value="0.81" | 810 m || 
|-id=072 bgcolor=#d6d6d6
| 547072 ||  || — || February 14, 2010 || Mount Lemmon || Mount Lemmon Survey ||  || align=right | 3.1 km || 
|-id=073 bgcolor=#fefefe
| 547073 ||  || — || September 12, 2001 || Kitt Peak || L. H. Wasserman, E. L. Ryan ||  || align=right data-sort-value="0.62" | 620 m || 
|-id=074 bgcolor=#d6d6d6
| 547074 ||  || — || February 15, 2010 || Kitt Peak || Spacewatch ||  || align=right | 2.8 km || 
|-id=075 bgcolor=#fefefe
| 547075 ||  || — || October 20, 2008 || Mount Lemmon || Mount Lemmon Survey ||  || align=right data-sort-value="0.78" | 780 m || 
|-id=076 bgcolor=#fefefe
| 547076 ||  || — || February 15, 2010 || Mount Lemmon || Mount Lemmon Survey ||  || align=right data-sort-value="0.74" | 740 m || 
|-id=077 bgcolor=#fefefe
| 547077 ||  || — || January 9, 2006 || Kitt Peak || Spacewatch ||  || align=right data-sort-value="0.71" | 710 m || 
|-id=078 bgcolor=#fefefe
| 547078 ||  || — || November 1, 2005 || Mount Lemmon || Mount Lemmon Survey ||  || align=right data-sort-value="0.57" | 570 m || 
|-id=079 bgcolor=#fefefe
| 547079 ||  || — || February 15, 2010 || Mount Lemmon || Mount Lemmon Survey ||  || align=right data-sort-value="0.94" | 940 m || 
|-id=080 bgcolor=#fefefe
| 547080 ||  || — || September 8, 2000 || Kitt Peak || Spacewatch ||  || align=right data-sort-value="0.94" | 940 m || 
|-id=081 bgcolor=#E9E9E9
| 547081 ||  || — || March 4, 2006 || Kitt Peak || Spacewatch ||  || align=right | 1.4 km || 
|-id=082 bgcolor=#d6d6d6
| 547082 ||  || — || February 13, 2010 || Mount Lemmon || Mount Lemmon Survey ||  || align=right | 2.5 km || 
|-id=083 bgcolor=#d6d6d6
| 547083 ||  || — || February 5, 2010 || Kitt Peak || Spacewatch ||  || align=right | 2.7 km || 
|-id=084 bgcolor=#d6d6d6
| 547084 ||  || — || January 5, 2010 || Kitt Peak || Spacewatch ||  || align=right | 3.9 km || 
|-id=085 bgcolor=#fefefe
| 547085 ||  || — || January 2, 2006 || Mount Lemmon || Mount Lemmon Survey ||  || align=right | 1.0 km || 
|-id=086 bgcolor=#d6d6d6
| 547086 ||  || — || February 10, 2010 || Kitt Peak || Spacewatch ||  || align=right | 2.6 km || 
|-id=087 bgcolor=#d6d6d6
| 547087 ||  || — || February 10, 2010 || Kitt Peak || Spacewatch ||  || align=right | 2.5 km || 
|-id=088 bgcolor=#d6d6d6
| 547088 ||  || — || February 9, 2010 || Kitt Peak || Spacewatch ||  || align=right | 2.8 km || 
|-id=089 bgcolor=#d6d6d6
| 547089 ||  || — || January 11, 2010 || Kitt Peak || Spacewatch ||  || align=right | 3.2 km || 
|-id=090 bgcolor=#d6d6d6
| 547090 ||  || — || February 13, 2010 || Mount Lemmon || Mount Lemmon Survey ||  || align=right | 2.5 km || 
|-id=091 bgcolor=#E9E9E9
| 547091 ||  || — || November 3, 2008 || Mount Lemmon || Mount Lemmon Survey ||  || align=right | 1.0 km || 
|-id=092 bgcolor=#fefefe
| 547092 ||  || — || October 23, 2005 || Kitt Peak || Spacewatch ||  || align=right data-sort-value="0.73" | 730 m || 
|-id=093 bgcolor=#fefefe
| 547093 ||  || — || May 13, 1996 || Kitt Peak || Spacewatch ||  || align=right data-sort-value="0.53" | 530 m || 
|-id=094 bgcolor=#d6d6d6
| 547094 ||  || — || January 11, 2010 || Kitt Peak || Spacewatch || Tj (2.98) || align=right | 2.7 km || 
|-id=095 bgcolor=#d6d6d6
| 547095 ||  || — || February 10, 2010 || Kitt Peak || Spacewatch ||  || align=right | 2.0 km || 
|-id=096 bgcolor=#d6d6d6
| 547096 ||  || — || January 12, 2010 || Kitt Peak || Spacewatch ||  || align=right | 3.4 km || 
|-id=097 bgcolor=#d6d6d6
| 547097 ||  || — || February 10, 2010 || Kitt Peak || Spacewatch ||  || align=right | 2.7 km || 
|-id=098 bgcolor=#d6d6d6
| 547098 ||  || — || April 6, 2011 || Mount Lemmon || Mount Lemmon Survey ||  || align=right | 2.6 km || 
|-id=099 bgcolor=#d6d6d6
| 547099 ||  || — || October 27, 2008 || Kitt Peak || Spacewatch ||  || align=right | 2.7 km || 
|-id=100 bgcolor=#d6d6d6
| 547100 ||  || — || April 28, 2011 || Haleakala || Pan-STARRS ||  || align=right | 2.8 km || 
|}

547101–547200 

|-bgcolor=#d6d6d6
| 547101 ||  || — || January 27, 2017 || Haleakala || Pan-STARRS ||  || align=right | 2.9 km || 
|-id=102 bgcolor=#d6d6d6
| 547102 ||  || — || December 13, 2015 || Haleakala || Pan-STARRS ||  || align=right | 2.9 km || 
|-id=103 bgcolor=#d6d6d6
| 547103 ||  || — || December 12, 2014 || Haleakala || Pan-STARRS ||  || align=right | 3.0 km || 
|-id=104 bgcolor=#E9E9E9
| 547104 ||  || — || August 17, 1995 || Kitt Peak || Spacewatch ||  || align=right | 1.1 km || 
|-id=105 bgcolor=#d6d6d6
| 547105 ||  || — || March 7, 2016 || Haleakala || Pan-STARRS ||  || align=right | 3.5 km || 
|-id=106 bgcolor=#d6d6d6
| 547106 ||  || — || June 23, 2017 || Haleakala || Pan-STARRS ||  || align=right | 2.6 km || 
|-id=107 bgcolor=#d6d6d6
| 547107 ||  || — || August 15, 2013 || Haleakala || Pan-STARRS ||  || align=right | 2.0 km || 
|-id=108 bgcolor=#d6d6d6
| 547108 ||  || — || February 16, 2016 || Mount Lemmon || Mount Lemmon Survey || Tj (2.99) || align=right | 2.9 km || 
|-id=109 bgcolor=#d6d6d6
| 547109 ||  || — || October 2, 2013 || Mount Lemmon || Mount Lemmon Survey ||  || align=right | 2.6 km || 
|-id=110 bgcolor=#d6d6d6
| 547110 ||  || — || November 26, 2014 || Haleakala || Pan-STARRS ||  || align=right | 2.2 km || 
|-id=111 bgcolor=#d6d6d6
| 547111 ||  || — || February 13, 2010 || Mount Lemmon || Mount Lemmon Survey ||  || align=right | 2.2 km || 
|-id=112 bgcolor=#d6d6d6
| 547112 ||  || — || August 15, 2013 || Haleakala || Pan-STARRS ||  || align=right | 2.7 km || 
|-id=113 bgcolor=#d6d6d6
| 547113 ||  || — || October 4, 2007 || Mount Lemmon || Mount Lemmon Survey ||  || align=right | 2.9 km || 
|-id=114 bgcolor=#E9E9E9
| 547114 ||  || — || February 15, 2010 || Mount Lemmon || Mount Lemmon Survey ||  || align=right | 1.6 km || 
|-id=115 bgcolor=#d6d6d6
| 547115 ||  || — || July 17, 2007 || La Sagra || OAM Obs. ||  || align=right | 3.6 km || 
|-id=116 bgcolor=#d6d6d6
| 547116 ||  || — || February 5, 2010 || Catalina || CSS ||  || align=right | 2.5 km || 
|-id=117 bgcolor=#fefefe
| 547117 ||  || — || February 16, 2010 || Mount Lemmon || Mount Lemmon Survey ||  || align=right data-sort-value="0.87" | 870 m || 
|-id=118 bgcolor=#d6d6d6
| 547118 ||  || — || February 16, 2010 || Mount Lemmon || Mount Lemmon Survey ||  || align=right | 3.3 km || 
|-id=119 bgcolor=#d6d6d6
| 547119 ||  || — || September 15, 2007 || Mount Lemmon || Mount Lemmon Survey ||  || align=right | 2.9 km || 
|-id=120 bgcolor=#fefefe
| 547120 ||  || — || December 30, 2005 || Kitt Peak || Spacewatch ||  || align=right data-sort-value="0.94" | 940 m || 
|-id=121 bgcolor=#fefefe
| 547121 ||  || — || April 25, 2003 || Kitt Peak || Spacewatch ||  || align=right data-sort-value="0.97" | 970 m || 
|-id=122 bgcolor=#d6d6d6
| 547122 ||  || — || February 16, 2010 || Mount Lemmon || Mount Lemmon Survey ||  || align=right | 1.9 km || 
|-id=123 bgcolor=#d6d6d6
| 547123 ||  || — || February 16, 2010 || Kitt Peak || Spacewatch ||  || align=right | 2.4 km || 
|-id=124 bgcolor=#d6d6d6
| 547124 ||  || — || February 16, 2010 || Mount Lemmon || Mount Lemmon Survey ||  || align=right | 2.1 km || 
|-id=125 bgcolor=#fefefe
| 547125 ||  || — || January 15, 2010 || Kitt Peak || Spacewatch || H || align=right data-sort-value="0.70" | 700 m || 
|-id=126 bgcolor=#d6d6d6
| 547126 ||  || — || December 20, 2009 || Mount Lemmon || Mount Lemmon Survey ||  || align=right | 2.5 km || 
|-id=127 bgcolor=#d6d6d6
| 547127 ||  || — || September 25, 2008 || Mount Lemmon || Mount Lemmon Survey ||  || align=right | 3.5 km || 
|-id=128 bgcolor=#fefefe
| 547128 ||  || — || October 6, 2008 || Mount Lemmon || Mount Lemmon Survey ||  || align=right | 1.0 km || 
|-id=129 bgcolor=#d6d6d6
| 547129 ||  || — || December 22, 2008 || Kitt Peak || Spacewatch ||  || align=right | 3.1 km || 
|-id=130 bgcolor=#d6d6d6
| 547130 ||  || — || February 5, 2010 || Catalina || CSS ||  || align=right | 3.0 km || 
|-id=131 bgcolor=#fefefe
| 547131 ||  || — || October 13, 2004 || Kitt Peak || Spacewatch ||  || align=right data-sort-value="0.87" | 870 m || 
|-id=132 bgcolor=#fefefe
| 547132 ||  || — || December 7, 2005 || Kitt Peak || Spacewatch ||  || align=right data-sort-value="0.64" | 640 m || 
|-id=133 bgcolor=#fefefe
| 547133 ||  || — || November 12, 2001 || Apache Point || SDSS Collaboration ||  || align=right data-sort-value="0.68" | 680 m || 
|-id=134 bgcolor=#fefefe
| 547134 ||  || — || September 23, 2004 || Kitt Peak || Spacewatch ||  || align=right data-sort-value="0.80" | 800 m || 
|-id=135 bgcolor=#d6d6d6
| 547135 ||  || — || February 16, 2010 || Kitt Peak || Spacewatch ||  || align=right | 2.4 km || 
|-id=136 bgcolor=#d6d6d6
| 547136 ||  || — || February 17, 2010 || Mount Lemmon || Mount Lemmon Survey ||  || align=right | 2.3 km || 
|-id=137 bgcolor=#d6d6d6
| 547137 ||  || — || February 17, 2010 || Kitt Peak || Spacewatch ||  || align=right | 2.0 km || 
|-id=138 bgcolor=#d6d6d6
| 547138 ||  || — || February 17, 2010 || Kitt Peak || Spacewatch ||  || align=right | 2.8 km || 
|-id=139 bgcolor=#fefefe
| 547139 ||  || — || February 17, 2010 || Kitt Peak || Spacewatch ||  || align=right data-sort-value="0.62" | 620 m || 
|-id=140 bgcolor=#E9E9E9
| 547140 ||  || — || February 17, 2010 || Mount Lemmon || Mount Lemmon Survey ||  || align=right | 1.7 km || 
|-id=141 bgcolor=#fefefe
| 547141 ||  || — || February 17, 2010 || Mount Lemmon || Mount Lemmon Survey ||  || align=right data-sort-value="0.71" | 710 m || 
|-id=142 bgcolor=#fefefe
| 547142 ||  || — || February 18, 2010 || Mount Lemmon || Mount Lemmon Survey ||  || align=right data-sort-value="0.68" | 680 m || 
|-id=143 bgcolor=#d6d6d6
| 547143 ||  || — || February 19, 2010 || Kitt Peak || Spacewatch ||  || align=right | 3.3 km || 
|-id=144 bgcolor=#fefefe
| 547144 ||  || — || December 7, 2005 || Kitt Peak || Spacewatch ||  || align=right data-sort-value="0.98" | 980 m || 
|-id=145 bgcolor=#fefefe
| 547145 ||  || — || October 21, 2012 || Kitt Peak || Spacewatch ||  || align=right data-sort-value="0.85" | 850 m || 
|-id=146 bgcolor=#d6d6d6
| 547146 ||  || — || January 5, 2010 || Kitt Peak || Spacewatch ||  || align=right | 3.9 km || 
|-id=147 bgcolor=#d6d6d6
| 547147 ||  || — || February 14, 2005 || Kitt Peak || Spacewatch ||  || align=right | 2.2 km || 
|-id=148 bgcolor=#d6d6d6
| 547148 ||  || — || January 1, 2008 || Kitt Peak || Spacewatch || 3:2 || align=right | 5.6 km || 
|-id=149 bgcolor=#E9E9E9
| 547149 ||  || — || October 11, 2007 || Mount Lemmon || Mount Lemmon Survey ||  || align=right | 1.0 km || 
|-id=150 bgcolor=#E9E9E9
| 547150 ||  || — || February 17, 2010 || Mount Lemmon || Mount Lemmon Survey ||  || align=right | 1.6 km || 
|-id=151 bgcolor=#fefefe
| 547151 ||  || — || October 24, 2013 || Mount Lemmon || Mount Lemmon Survey ||  || align=right | 1.1 km || 
|-id=152 bgcolor=#d6d6d6
| 547152 ||  || — || March 18, 2016 || Mount Lemmon || Mount Lemmon Survey ||  || align=right | 2.5 km || 
|-id=153 bgcolor=#d6d6d6
| 547153 ||  || — || February 3, 2016 || Haleakala || Pan-STARRS ||  || align=right | 2.8 km || 
|-id=154 bgcolor=#d6d6d6
| 547154 ||  || — || February 14, 2016 || Haleakala || Pan-STARRS ||  || align=right | 3.3 km || 
|-id=155 bgcolor=#d6d6d6
| 547155 ||  || — || April 28, 2011 || Kitt Peak || Spacewatch ||  || align=right | 3.2 km || 
|-id=156 bgcolor=#d6d6d6
| 547156 ||  || — || February 16, 2010 || Kitt Peak || Spacewatch ||  || align=right | 2.9 km || 
|-id=157 bgcolor=#d6d6d6
| 547157 ||  || — || August 9, 2013 || Haleakala || Pan-STARRS ||  || align=right | 2.4 km || 
|-id=158 bgcolor=#d6d6d6
| 547158 ||  || — || January 16, 2010 || Kitt Peak || Spacewatch ||  || align=right | 2.7 km || 
|-id=159 bgcolor=#d6d6d6
| 547159 ||  || — || February 17, 2010 || Kitt Peak || Spacewatch ||  || align=right | 2.4 km || 
|-id=160 bgcolor=#d6d6d6
| 547160 ||  || — || September 13, 2013 || Mount Lemmon || Mount Lemmon Survey ||  || align=right | 2.3 km || 
|-id=161 bgcolor=#d6d6d6
| 547161 ||  || — || August 14, 2013 || Haleakala || Pan-STARRS ||  || align=right | 2.3 km || 
|-id=162 bgcolor=#d6d6d6
| 547162 ||  || — || September 14, 2013 || Kitt Peak || Spacewatch ||  || align=right | 2.3 km || 
|-id=163 bgcolor=#fefefe
| 547163 ||  || — || February 18, 2010 || Kitt Peak || Spacewatch ||  || align=right data-sort-value="0.67" | 670 m || 
|-id=164 bgcolor=#fefefe
| 547164 ||  || — || March 8, 2010 || Taunus || S. Karge, E. Schwab ||  || align=right data-sort-value="0.90" | 900 m || 
|-id=165 bgcolor=#d6d6d6
| 547165 ||  || — || March 6, 2010 || Plana || F. Fratev || EOS || align=right | 2.3 km || 
|-id=166 bgcolor=#d6d6d6
| 547166 ||  || — || November 7, 2008 || Mount Lemmon || Mount Lemmon Survey ||  || align=right | 3.3 km || 
|-id=167 bgcolor=#d6d6d6
| 547167 ||  || — || February 14, 2010 || Mount Lemmon || Mount Lemmon Survey ||  || align=right | 2.2 km || 
|-id=168 bgcolor=#d6d6d6
| 547168 ||  || — || February 9, 2010 || Kitt Peak || Spacewatch ||  || align=right | 2.6 km || 
|-id=169 bgcolor=#d6d6d6
| 547169 ||  || — || March 14, 2010 || Pla D'Arguines || R. Ferrando, M. Ferrando ||  || align=right | 4.2 km || 
|-id=170 bgcolor=#fefefe
| 547170 ||  || — || February 14, 2010 || Catalina || CSS ||  || align=right data-sort-value="0.97" | 970 m || 
|-id=171 bgcolor=#d6d6d6
| 547171 ||  || — || March 13, 2010 || Dauban || C. Rinner, F. Kugel ||  || align=right | 3.0 km || 
|-id=172 bgcolor=#d6d6d6
| 547172 ||  || — || February 17, 2010 || Kitt Peak || Spacewatch ||  || align=right | 3.0 km || 
|-id=173 bgcolor=#d6d6d6
| 547173 ||  || — || October 21, 1995 || Kitt Peak || Spacewatch ||  || align=right | 3.0 km || 
|-id=174 bgcolor=#d6d6d6
| 547174 ||  || — || May 25, 2006 || Mount Lemmon || Mount Lemmon Survey ||  || align=right | 2.9 km || 
|-id=175 bgcolor=#fefefe
| 547175 ||  || — || March 12, 2010 || Kitt Peak || Spacewatch ||  || align=right data-sort-value="0.78" | 780 m || 
|-id=176 bgcolor=#d6d6d6
| 547176 ||  || — || March 12, 2010 || Catalina || CSS ||  || align=right | 2.4 km || 
|-id=177 bgcolor=#E9E9E9
| 547177 ||  || — || March 12, 2010 || Mount Lemmon || Mount Lemmon Survey ||  || align=right data-sort-value="0.99" | 990 m || 
|-id=178 bgcolor=#E9E9E9
| 547178 ||  || — || October 6, 2008 || Mount Lemmon || Mount Lemmon Survey ||  || align=right data-sort-value="0.94" | 940 m || 
|-id=179 bgcolor=#fefefe
| 547179 ||  || — || October 15, 2007 || Mount Lemmon || Mount Lemmon Survey ||  || align=right data-sort-value="0.79" | 790 m || 
|-id=180 bgcolor=#fefefe
| 547180 ||  || — || January 7, 2006 || Kitt Peak || Spacewatch ||  || align=right data-sort-value="0.60" | 600 m || 
|-id=181 bgcolor=#fefefe
| 547181 ||  || — || October 7, 2004 || Kitt Peak || Spacewatch ||  || align=right | 1.1 km || 
|-id=182 bgcolor=#fefefe
| 547182 ||  || — || March 14, 2010 || Kitt Peak || Spacewatch ||  || align=right data-sort-value="0.67" | 670 m || 
|-id=183 bgcolor=#E9E9E9
| 547183 ||  || — || March 4, 2010 || Kitt Peak || Spacewatch ||  || align=right | 1.6 km || 
|-id=184 bgcolor=#d6d6d6
| 547184 ||  || — || February 18, 2010 || Mount Lemmon || Mount Lemmon Survey ||  || align=right | 3.6 km || 
|-id=185 bgcolor=#fefefe
| 547185 ||  || — || March 14, 2010 || Kitt Peak || Spacewatch ||  || align=right data-sort-value="0.80" | 800 m || 
|-id=186 bgcolor=#fefefe
| 547186 ||  || — || March 14, 2010 || Kitt Peak || Spacewatch ||  || align=right data-sort-value="0.73" | 730 m || 
|-id=187 bgcolor=#d6d6d6
| 547187 ||  || — || February 22, 2004 || Kitt Peak || Spacewatch ||  || align=right | 2.9 km || 
|-id=188 bgcolor=#fefefe
| 547188 ||  || — || October 2, 2008 || Kitt Peak || Spacewatch ||  || align=right data-sort-value="0.81" | 810 m || 
|-id=189 bgcolor=#fefefe
| 547189 ||  || — || March 15, 2010 || Kitt Peak || Spacewatch || H || align=right data-sort-value="0.65" | 650 m || 
|-id=190 bgcolor=#fefefe
| 547190 ||  || — || December 8, 2005 || Kitt Peak || Spacewatch ||  || align=right data-sort-value="0.83" | 830 m || 
|-id=191 bgcolor=#fefefe
| 547191 ||  || — || March 13, 2010 || Kitt Peak || Spacewatch ||  || align=right data-sort-value="0.60" | 600 m || 
|-id=192 bgcolor=#fefefe
| 547192 ||  || — || March 14, 2010 || Kitt Peak || Spacewatch ||  || align=right | 1.1 km || 
|-id=193 bgcolor=#d6d6d6
| 547193 ||  || — || January 24, 2015 || Haleakala || Pan-STARRS ||  || align=right | 3.6 km || 
|-id=194 bgcolor=#d6d6d6
| 547194 ||  || — || May 3, 2005 || Kitt Peak || Spacewatch ||  || align=right | 2.9 km || 
|-id=195 bgcolor=#E9E9E9
| 547195 ||  || — || June 12, 2007 || Kitt Peak || Spacewatch ||  || align=right | 1.4 km || 
|-id=196 bgcolor=#d6d6d6
| 547196 ||  || — || August 22, 2014 || Haleakala || Pan-STARRS ||  || align=right | 2.8 km || 
|-id=197 bgcolor=#d6d6d6
| 547197 ||  || — || September 20, 2003 || Kitt Peak || Spacewatch ||  || align=right | 1.9 km || 
|-id=198 bgcolor=#d6d6d6
| 547198 ||  || — || September 24, 2008 || Catalina || CSS ||  || align=right | 3.4 km || 
|-id=199 bgcolor=#d6d6d6
| 547199 ||  || — || December 29, 2014 || Haleakala || Pan-STARRS ||  || align=right | 2.3 km || 
|-id=200 bgcolor=#fefefe
| 547200 ||  || — || March 15, 2010 || Kitt Peak || Spacewatch ||  || align=right data-sort-value="0.64" | 640 m || 
|}

547201–547300 

|-bgcolor=#d6d6d6
| 547201 ||  || — || February 18, 2010 || Kitt Peak || Spacewatch ||  || align=right | 2.2 km || 
|-id=202 bgcolor=#E9E9E9
| 547202 ||  || — || March 12, 2010 || Kitt Peak || Spacewatch ||  || align=right | 1.2 km || 
|-id=203 bgcolor=#d6d6d6
| 547203 ||  || — || February 12, 2004 || Kitt Peak || Spacewatch ||  || align=right | 2.6 km || 
|-id=204 bgcolor=#d6d6d6
| 547204 ||  || — || May 3, 2005 || Kitt Peak || Spacewatch ||  || align=right | 3.0 km || 
|-id=205 bgcolor=#d6d6d6
| 547205 ||  || — || October 7, 2007 || Mount Lemmon || Mount Lemmon Survey ||  || align=right | 2.6 km || 
|-id=206 bgcolor=#E9E9E9
| 547206 ||  || — || March 17, 2010 || Dauban || C. Rinner, F. Kugel ||  || align=right | 2.1 km || 
|-id=207 bgcolor=#d6d6d6
| 547207 ||  || — || January 17, 2004 || Palomar || NEAT ||  || align=right | 3.3 km || 
|-id=208 bgcolor=#fefefe
| 547208 ||  || — || December 2, 2005 || Mauna Kea || Mauna Kea Obs. ||  || align=right data-sort-value="0.98" | 980 m || 
|-id=209 bgcolor=#E9E9E9
| 547209 ||  || — || October 1, 2008 || Kitt Peak || Spacewatch ||  || align=right | 1.0 km || 
|-id=210 bgcolor=#E9E9E9
| 547210 ||  || — || March 18, 2010 || Kitt Peak || Spacewatch ||  || align=right | 1.3 km || 
|-id=211 bgcolor=#d6d6d6
| 547211 ||  || — || March 20, 2010 || Kitt Peak || Spacewatch ||  || align=right | 2.1 km || 
|-id=212 bgcolor=#fefefe
| 547212 ||  || — || March 20, 2010 || Mount Lemmon || Mount Lemmon Survey ||  || align=right data-sort-value="0.80" | 800 m || 
|-id=213 bgcolor=#d6d6d6
| 547213 ||  || — || March 20, 2010 || Mount Lemmon || Mount Lemmon Survey ||  || align=right | 2.3 km || 
|-id=214 bgcolor=#E9E9E9
| 547214 ||  || — || May 20, 2006 || Kitt Peak || Spacewatch ||  || align=right | 1.4 km || 
|-id=215 bgcolor=#d6d6d6
| 547215 ||  || — || February 13, 2004 || Kitt Peak || Spacewatch ||  || align=right | 3.4 km || 
|-id=216 bgcolor=#d6d6d6
| 547216 ||  || — || August 26, 2001 || Palomar || NEAT ||  || align=right | 4.4 km || 
|-id=217 bgcolor=#E9E9E9
| 547217 ||  || — || October 11, 2007 || Mount Lemmon || Mount Lemmon Survey ||  || align=right data-sort-value="0.99" | 990 m || 
|-id=218 bgcolor=#fefefe
| 547218 ||  || — || December 3, 2005 || Mauna Kea || Mauna Kea Obs. ||  || align=right data-sort-value="0.83" | 830 m || 
|-id=219 bgcolor=#fefefe
| 547219 ||  || — || March 22, 2010 || ESA OGS || ESA OGS ||  || align=right | 1.1 km || 
|-id=220 bgcolor=#d6d6d6
| 547220 ||  || — || May 16, 2005 || Mount Lemmon || Mount Lemmon Survey ||  || align=right | 3.1 km || 
|-id=221 bgcolor=#d6d6d6
| 547221 ||  || — || March 26, 2010 || Kitt Peak || Spacewatch ||  || align=right | 3.0 km || 
|-id=222 bgcolor=#fefefe
| 547222 ||  || — || March 19, 2010 || Mount Lemmon || Mount Lemmon Survey ||  || align=right data-sort-value="0.68" | 680 m || 
|-id=223 bgcolor=#d6d6d6
| 547223 ||  || — || September 21, 2012 || Catalina || CSS ||  || align=right | 3.5 km || 
|-id=224 bgcolor=#E9E9E9
| 547224 ||  || — || March 17, 2010 || Palomar || PTF ||  || align=right | 1.7 km || 
|-id=225 bgcolor=#E9E9E9
| 547225 ||  || — || March 20, 2010 || Kitt Peak || Spacewatch ||  || align=right | 1.8 km || 
|-id=226 bgcolor=#d6d6d6
| 547226 ||  || — || August 13, 2012 || Haleakala || Pan-STARRS || Tj (2.95) || align=right | 3.2 km || 
|-id=227 bgcolor=#d6d6d6
| 547227 ||  || — || March 19, 2010 || Mount Lemmon || Mount Lemmon Survey ||  || align=right | 2.3 km || 
|-id=228 bgcolor=#fefefe
| 547228 ||  || — || March 18, 2010 || Mount Lemmon || Mount Lemmon Survey ||  || align=right data-sort-value="0.98" | 980 m || 
|-id=229 bgcolor=#d6d6d6
| 547229 ||  || — || February 4, 2016 || Haleakala || Pan-STARRS ||  || align=right | 3.5 km || 
|-id=230 bgcolor=#d6d6d6
| 547230 ||  || — || November 12, 2007 || Mount Lemmon || Mount Lemmon Survey || 7:4 || align=right | 3.6 km || 
|-id=231 bgcolor=#E9E9E9
| 547231 ||  || — || December 3, 2012 || Mount Lemmon || Mount Lemmon Survey ||  || align=right data-sort-value="0.94" | 940 m || 
|-id=232 bgcolor=#d6d6d6
| 547232 ||  || — || November 26, 2014 || Haleakala || Pan-STARRS ||  || align=right | 2.3 km || 
|-id=233 bgcolor=#d6d6d6
| 547233 ||  || — || March 19, 2010 || Mount Lemmon || Mount Lemmon Survey ||  || align=right | 2.0 km || 
|-id=234 bgcolor=#fefefe
| 547234 ||  || — || April 5, 2010 || Mount Lemmon || Mount Lemmon Survey ||  || align=right data-sort-value="0.82" | 820 m || 
|-id=235 bgcolor=#E9E9E9
| 547235 ||  || — || April 8, 2006 || Kitt Peak || Spacewatch ||  || align=right | 1.8 km || 
|-id=236 bgcolor=#fefefe
| 547236 ||  || — || April 5, 2010 || Kitt Peak || Spacewatch ||  || align=right data-sort-value="0.82" | 820 m || 
|-id=237 bgcolor=#E9E9E9
| 547237 ||  || — || March 18, 2010 || Mount Lemmon || Mount Lemmon Survey ||  || align=right data-sort-value="0.98" | 980 m || 
|-id=238 bgcolor=#fefefe
| 547238 ||  || — || October 21, 2001 || Socorro || LINEAR || H || align=right data-sort-value="0.76" | 760 m || 
|-id=239 bgcolor=#E9E9E9
| 547239 ||  || — || April 13, 2002 || Kitt Peak || Spacewatch ||  || align=right | 1.5 km || 
|-id=240 bgcolor=#d6d6d6
| 547240 ||  || — || April 10, 2010 || WISE || WISE || 7:4 || align=right | 4.5 km || 
|-id=241 bgcolor=#d6d6d6
| 547241 ||  || — || January 16, 2010 || Mount Lemmon || Mount Lemmon Survey ||  || align=right | 2.3 km || 
|-id=242 bgcolor=#E9E9E9
| 547242 ||  || — || April 13, 2010 || WISE || WISE ||  || align=right data-sort-value="0.97" | 970 m || 
|-id=243 bgcolor=#d6d6d6
| 547243 ||  || — || April 14, 2010 || Kachina || J. Hobart ||  || align=right | 3.9 km || 
|-id=244 bgcolor=#d6d6d6
| 547244 ||  || — || October 1, 2006 || Kitt Peak || Spacewatch || 7:4 || align=right | 3.4 km || 
|-id=245 bgcolor=#E9E9E9
| 547245 ||  || — || April 2, 2006 || Kitt Peak || Spacewatch ||  || align=right data-sort-value="0.94" | 940 m || 
|-id=246 bgcolor=#d6d6d6
| 547246 ||  || — || September 11, 2007 || Kitt Peak || Spacewatch ||  || align=right | 2.6 km || 
|-id=247 bgcolor=#fefefe
| 547247 ||  || — || June 12, 1999 || Kitt Peak || Spacewatch ||  || align=right data-sort-value="0.73" | 730 m || 
|-id=248 bgcolor=#E9E9E9
| 547248 ||  || — || April 8, 2010 || Kitt Peak || Spacewatch ||  || align=right | 1.2 km || 
|-id=249 bgcolor=#d6d6d6
| 547249 ||  || — || March 18, 2010 || Kitt Peak || Spacewatch ||  || align=right | 2.1 km || 
|-id=250 bgcolor=#d6d6d6
| 547250 ||  || — || April 10, 2010 || Mount Lemmon || Mount Lemmon Survey ||  || align=right | 2.5 km || 
|-id=251 bgcolor=#E9E9E9
| 547251 ||  || — || April 11, 2010 || Kitt Peak || Spacewatch ||  || align=right | 2.3 km || 
|-id=252 bgcolor=#fefefe
| 547252 ||  || — || April 11, 2010 || Mount Lemmon || Mount Lemmon Survey || H || align=right data-sort-value="0.62" | 620 m || 
|-id=253 bgcolor=#d6d6d6
| 547253 ||  || — || September 19, 2001 || Kitt Peak || Spacewatch ||  || align=right | 3.0 km || 
|-id=254 bgcolor=#fefefe
| 547254 ||  || — || December 2, 2008 || Kitt Peak || Spacewatch ||  || align=right data-sort-value="0.72" | 720 m || 
|-id=255 bgcolor=#fefefe
| 547255 ||  || — || September 6, 2008 || Kitt Peak || Spacewatch ||  || align=right data-sort-value="0.90" | 900 m || 
|-id=256 bgcolor=#d6d6d6
| 547256 ||  || — || April 10, 2010 || Mount Lemmon || Mount Lemmon Survey ||  || align=right | 3.5 km || 
|-id=257 bgcolor=#fefefe
| 547257 ||  || — || March 11, 2002 || Palomar || NEAT ||  || align=right | 1.1 km || 
|-id=258 bgcolor=#fefefe
| 547258 ||  || — || October 29, 2008 || Mount Lemmon || Mount Lemmon Survey ||  || align=right data-sort-value="0.84" | 840 m || 
|-id=259 bgcolor=#fefefe
| 547259 ||  || — || November 9, 2004 || Mauna Kea || Mauna Kea Obs. || NYS || align=right data-sort-value="0.79" | 790 m || 
|-id=260 bgcolor=#E9E9E9
| 547260 ||  || — || October 8, 2012 || Haleakala || Pan-STARRS ||  || align=right | 1.3 km || 
|-id=261 bgcolor=#d6d6d6
| 547261 ||  || — || February 10, 2010 || Kitt Peak || Spacewatch ||  || align=right | 3.6 km || 
|-id=262 bgcolor=#d6d6d6
| 547262 ||  || — || November 17, 2014 || Mount Lemmon || Mount Lemmon Survey ||  || align=right | 3.4 km || 
|-id=263 bgcolor=#d6d6d6
| 547263 ||  || — || October 31, 2008 || Mount Lemmon || Mount Lemmon Survey ||  || align=right | 2.6 km || 
|-id=264 bgcolor=#E9E9E9
| 547264 ||  || — || February 11, 2014 || Mount Lemmon || Mount Lemmon Survey ||  || align=right | 1.2 km || 
|-id=265 bgcolor=#E9E9E9
| 547265 ||  || — || November 24, 2012 || Kitt Peak || Spacewatch ||  || align=right | 1.3 km || 
|-id=266 bgcolor=#E9E9E9
| 547266 ||  || — || September 2, 2016 || Mount Lemmon || Mount Lemmon Survey ||  || align=right data-sort-value="0.98" | 980 m || 
|-id=267 bgcolor=#E9E9E9
| 547267 ||  || — || August 20, 2011 || Haleakala || Pan-STARRS ||  || align=right | 1.7 km || 
|-id=268 bgcolor=#E9E9E9
| 547268 ||  || — || September 2, 2016 || Mount Lemmon || Mount Lemmon Survey ||  || align=right | 1.0 km || 
|-id=269 bgcolor=#fefefe
| 547269 ||  || — || February 25, 2006 || Kitt Peak || Spacewatch ||  || align=right data-sort-value="0.69" | 690 m || 
|-id=270 bgcolor=#E9E9E9
| 547270 ||  || — || May 9, 2006 || Mount Lemmon || Mount Lemmon Survey ||  || align=right | 2.0 km || 
|-id=271 bgcolor=#E9E9E9
| 547271 ||  || — || April 25, 2010 || Mount Lemmon || Mount Lemmon Survey ||  || align=right | 1.6 km || 
|-id=272 bgcolor=#d6d6d6
| 547272 ||  || — || March 26, 2004 || Kitt Peak || Spacewatch || Tj (2.92) || align=right | 3.5 km || 
|-id=273 bgcolor=#E9E9E9
| 547273 ||  || — || April 26, 2010 || Mount Lemmon || Mount Lemmon Survey ||  || align=right | 2.1 km || 
|-id=274 bgcolor=#fefefe
| 547274 ||  || — || February 15, 2010 || Mount Lemmon || Mount Lemmon Survey ||  || align=right data-sort-value="0.78" | 780 m || 
|-id=275 bgcolor=#d6d6d6
| 547275 ||  || — || May 16, 2013 || Haleakala || Pan-STARRS ||  || align=right | 4.1 km || 
|-id=276 bgcolor=#d6d6d6
| 547276 ||  || — || September 24, 2008 || Mount Lemmon || Mount Lemmon Survey ||  || align=right | 2.1 km || 
|-id=277 bgcolor=#d6d6d6
| 547277 ||  || — || June 4, 2011 || Mount Lemmon || Mount Lemmon Survey ||  || align=right | 2.7 km || 
|-id=278 bgcolor=#E9E9E9
| 547278 ||  || — || December 4, 2015 || Mount Lemmon || Mount Lemmon Survey ||  || align=right | 1.2 km || 
|-id=279 bgcolor=#E9E9E9
| 547279 ||  || — || May 3, 2006 || Mount Lemmon || Mount Lemmon Survey ||  || align=right data-sort-value="0.75" | 750 m || 
|-id=280 bgcolor=#E9E9E9
| 547280 ||  || — || April 24, 2006 || Anderson Mesa || LONEOS ||  || align=right | 1.0 km || 
|-id=281 bgcolor=#fefefe
| 547281 ||  || — || May 6, 2010 || Mount Lemmon || Mount Lemmon Survey ||  || align=right data-sort-value="0.85" | 850 m || 
|-id=282 bgcolor=#E9E9E9
| 547282 ||  || — || January 13, 2005 || Kitt Peak || Spacewatch ||  || align=right | 1.2 km || 
|-id=283 bgcolor=#fefefe
| 547283 ||  || — || May 4, 2010 || Catalina || CSS ||  || align=right data-sort-value="0.79" | 790 m || 
|-id=284 bgcolor=#fefefe
| 547284 ||  || — || March 19, 2010 || Kitt Peak || Spacewatch ||  || align=right data-sort-value="0.80" | 800 m || 
|-id=285 bgcolor=#E9E9E9
| 547285 ||  || — || May 9, 2010 || Mount Lemmon || Mount Lemmon Survey ||  || align=right | 1.1 km || 
|-id=286 bgcolor=#E9E9E9
| 547286 ||  || — || May 7, 2010 || Kitt Peak || Spacewatch ||  || align=right | 1.1 km || 
|-id=287 bgcolor=#d6d6d6
| 547287 ||  || — || September 24, 2008 || Mount Lemmon || Mount Lemmon Survey ||  || align=right | 2.5 km || 
|-id=288 bgcolor=#E9E9E9
| 547288 ||  || — || May 12, 2010 || Mount Lemmon || Mount Lemmon Survey ||  || align=right | 1.3 km || 
|-id=289 bgcolor=#fefefe
| 547289 ||  || — || May 12, 2010 || Nogales || M. Schwartz, P. R. Holvorcem ||  || align=right data-sort-value="0.85" | 850 m || 
|-id=290 bgcolor=#E9E9E9
| 547290 ||  || — || July 12, 2002 || Palomar || NEAT ||  || align=right | 1.5 km || 
|-id=291 bgcolor=#fefefe
| 547291 ||  || — || April 21, 2006 || Kitt Peak || Spacewatch ||  || align=right data-sort-value="0.91" | 910 m || 
|-id=292 bgcolor=#E9E9E9
| 547292 ||  || — || May 12, 2010 || Mount Lemmon || Mount Lemmon Survey ||  || align=right | 2.3 km || 
|-id=293 bgcolor=#E9E9E9
| 547293 ||  || — || May 12, 2010 || Mount Lemmon || Mount Lemmon Survey ||  || align=right data-sort-value="0.98" | 980 m || 
|-id=294 bgcolor=#fefefe
| 547294 ||  || — || March 12, 2002 || Palomar || NEAT || MAS || align=right data-sort-value="0.95" | 950 m || 
|-id=295 bgcolor=#E9E9E9
| 547295 ||  || — || May 11, 2010 || Mount Lemmon || Mount Lemmon Survey ||  || align=right data-sort-value="0.86" | 860 m || 
|-id=296 bgcolor=#E9E9E9
| 547296 ||  || — || May 11, 2010 || Mount Lemmon || Mount Lemmon Survey ||  || align=right | 2.0 km || 
|-id=297 bgcolor=#E9E9E9
| 547297 ||  || — || May 12, 2010 || Mount Lemmon || Mount Lemmon Survey ||  || align=right | 1.0 km || 
|-id=298 bgcolor=#E9E9E9
| 547298 ||  || — || May 13, 2010 || Kitt Peak || Spacewatch ||  || align=right | 1.2 km || 
|-id=299 bgcolor=#E9E9E9
| 547299 ||  || — || April 9, 2010 || Kitt Peak || Spacewatch ||  || align=right data-sort-value="0.98" | 980 m || 
|-id=300 bgcolor=#fefefe
| 547300 ||  || — || March 25, 2006 || Kitt Peak || Spacewatch ||  || align=right data-sort-value="0.70" | 700 m || 
|}

547301–547400 

|-bgcolor=#E9E9E9
| 547301 ||  || — || May 11, 2010 || Kitt Peak || Spacewatch ||  || align=right data-sort-value="0.91" | 910 m || 
|-id=302 bgcolor=#fefefe
| 547302 ||  || — || March 23, 2006 || Mount Lemmon || Mount Lemmon Survey || MAS || align=right data-sort-value="0.64" | 640 m || 
|-id=303 bgcolor=#E9E9E9
| 547303 ||  || — || April 9, 2010 || Kitt Peak || Spacewatch ||  || align=right | 2.0 km || 
|-id=304 bgcolor=#fefefe
| 547304 ||  || — || April 9, 2010 || Kitt Peak || Spacewatch ||  || align=right data-sort-value="0.75" | 750 m || 
|-id=305 bgcolor=#E9E9E9
| 547305 ||  || — || May 11, 2010 || Kitt Peak || Spacewatch ||  || align=right | 2.0 km || 
|-id=306 bgcolor=#E9E9E9
| 547306 ||  || — || November 8, 2007 || Mount Lemmon || Mount Lemmon Survey ||  || align=right | 1.1 km || 
|-id=307 bgcolor=#E9E9E9
| 547307 ||  || — || May 11, 2010 || Mount Lemmon || Mount Lemmon Survey ||  || align=right | 1.1 km || 
|-id=308 bgcolor=#E9E9E9
| 547308 ||  || — || May 11, 2010 || Kitt Peak || Spacewatch ||  || align=right | 1.5 km || 
|-id=309 bgcolor=#E9E9E9
| 547309 ||  || — || May 12, 2010 || Nogales || M. Schwartz, P. R. Holvorcem ||  || align=right | 2.3 km || 
|-id=310 bgcolor=#d6d6d6
| 547310 ||  || — || October 12, 2013 || Mount Lemmon || Mount Lemmon Survey ||  || align=right | 3.5 km || 
|-id=311 bgcolor=#d6d6d6
| 547311 ||  || — || November 30, 2008 || Mount Lemmon || Mount Lemmon Survey ||  || align=right | 2.5 km || 
|-id=312 bgcolor=#d6d6d6
| 547312 ||  || — || October 5, 2013 || Haleakala || Pan-STARRS ||  || align=right | 2.5 km || 
|-id=313 bgcolor=#E9E9E9
| 547313 ||  || — || February 1, 2009 || Catalina || CSS ||  || align=right | 1.4 km || 
|-id=314 bgcolor=#E9E9E9
| 547314 ||  || — || October 17, 2012 || Mount Lemmon || Mount Lemmon Survey ||  || align=right | 1.7 km || 
|-id=315 bgcolor=#E9E9E9
| 547315 ||  || — || May 11, 2010 || Mount Lemmon || Mount Lemmon Survey ||  || align=right | 1.8 km || 
|-id=316 bgcolor=#E9E9E9
| 547316 ||  || — || May 5, 2010 || Mount Lemmon || Mount Lemmon Survey ||  || align=right | 2.1 km || 
|-id=317 bgcolor=#E9E9E9
| 547317 ||  || — || May 11, 2010 || Mount Lemmon || Mount Lemmon Survey ||  || align=right | 2.4 km || 
|-id=318 bgcolor=#E9E9E9
| 547318 ||  || — || May 7, 2010 || Mount Lemmon || Mount Lemmon Survey ||  || align=right | 2.0 km || 
|-id=319 bgcolor=#E9E9E9
| 547319 ||  || — || July 29, 2002 || Palomar || NEAT || EUN || align=right | 1.5 km || 
|-id=320 bgcolor=#E9E9E9
| 547320 ||  || — || May 17, 2010 || Nogales || M. Schwartz, P. R. Holvorcem ||  || align=right | 2.0 km || 
|-id=321 bgcolor=#E9E9E9
| 547321 ||  || — || May 17, 2010 || Kitt Peak || Spacewatch ||  || align=right data-sort-value="0.82" | 820 m || 
|-id=322 bgcolor=#E9E9E9
| 547322 ||  || — || June 1, 2010 || Catalina || CSS ||  || align=right | 2.3 km || 
|-id=323 bgcolor=#E9E9E9
| 547323 ||  || — || April 22, 2009 || Mount Lemmon || Mount Lemmon Survey ||  || align=right | 2.0 km || 
|-id=324 bgcolor=#d6d6d6
| 547324 ||  || — || March 2, 2016 || Haleakala || Pan-STARRS ||  || align=right | 3.4 km || 
|-id=325 bgcolor=#d6d6d6
| 547325 ||  || — || January 8, 2016 || Haleakala || Pan-STARRS ||  || align=right | 2.8 km || 
|-id=326 bgcolor=#d6d6d6
| 547326 ||  || — || October 5, 2013 || Haleakala || Pan-STARRS ||  || align=right | 3.0 km || 
|-id=327 bgcolor=#d6d6d6
| 547327 ||  || — || September 15, 2013 || Haleakala || Pan-STARRS ||  || align=right | 2.8 km || 
|-id=328 bgcolor=#E9E9E9
| 547328 ||  || — || November 18, 2016 || Kitt Peak || Spacewatch ||  || align=right data-sort-value="0.83" | 830 m || 
|-id=329 bgcolor=#E9E9E9
| 547329 ||  || — || December 12, 2012 || Kitt Peak || Spacewatch ||  || align=right | 1.7 km || 
|-id=330 bgcolor=#E9E9E9
| 547330 ||  || — || May 25, 2010 || Mount Lemmon || Mount Lemmon Survey ||  || align=right | 2.0 km || 
|-id=331 bgcolor=#E9E9E9
| 547331 ||  || — || May 21, 2010 || Kitt Peak || Spacewatch ||  || align=right | 1.8 km || 
|-id=332 bgcolor=#E9E9E9
| 547332 ||  || — || June 4, 2010 || Nogales || M. Schwartz, P. R. Holvorcem ||  || align=right | 2.1 km || 
|-id=333 bgcolor=#E9E9E9
| 547333 ||  || — || June 6, 2010 || ESA OGS || ESA OGS ||  || align=right | 2.3 km || 
|-id=334 bgcolor=#E9E9E9
| 547334 ||  || — || May 11, 2010 || Mount Lemmon || Mount Lemmon Survey ||  || align=right | 1.3 km || 
|-id=335 bgcolor=#E9E9E9
| 547335 ||  || — || April 14, 2010 || Mount Lemmon || Mount Lemmon Survey ||  || align=right data-sort-value="0.98" | 980 m || 
|-id=336 bgcolor=#E9E9E9
| 547336 ||  || — || September 19, 2003 || Kitt Peak || Spacewatch || EUN || align=right | 1.4 km || 
|-id=337 bgcolor=#E9E9E9
| 547337 ||  || — || December 30, 2007 || Kitt Peak || Spacewatch ||  || align=right | 1.9 km || 
|-id=338 bgcolor=#E9E9E9
| 547338 ||  || — || September 20, 2007 || Kitt Peak || Spacewatch ||  || align=right | 1.1 km || 
|-id=339 bgcolor=#E9E9E9
| 547339 ||  || — || October 20, 2003 || Kitt Peak || Spacewatch ||  || align=right | 1.1 km || 
|-id=340 bgcolor=#E9E9E9
| 547340 ||  || — || November 2, 2007 || Mount Lemmon || Mount Lemmon Survey ||  || align=right | 1.1 km || 
|-id=341 bgcolor=#E9E9E9
| 547341 ||  || — || September 3, 2010 || Mount Lemmon || Mount Lemmon Survey ||  || align=right | 3.1 km || 
|-id=342 bgcolor=#E9E9E9
| 547342 ||  || — || November 19, 2016 || Mount Lemmon || Mount Lemmon Survey ||  || align=right | 1.4 km || 
|-id=343 bgcolor=#fefefe
| 547343 ||  || — || September 25, 2016 || Haleakala || Pan-STARRS ||  || align=right data-sort-value="0.78" | 780 m || 
|-id=344 bgcolor=#d6d6d6
| 547344 ||  || — || September 30, 2013 || Mount Lemmon || Mount Lemmon Survey ||  || align=right | 2.6 km || 
|-id=345 bgcolor=#E9E9E9
| 547345 ||  || — || July 26, 2015 || Haleakala || Pan-STARRS 2 ||  || align=right | 2.8 km || 
|-id=346 bgcolor=#d6d6d6
| 547346 ||  || — || October 10, 2007 || Mount Lemmon || Mount Lemmon Survey ||  || align=right | 3.1 km || 
|-id=347 bgcolor=#E9E9E9
| 547347 ||  || — || September 24, 2011 || Haleakala || Pan-STARRS ||  || align=right | 1.9 km || 
|-id=348 bgcolor=#fefefe
| 547348 ||  || — || February 12, 2000 || Apache Point || SDSS Collaboration ||  || align=right data-sort-value="0.59" | 590 m || 
|-id=349 bgcolor=#E9E9E9
| 547349 ||  || — || June 18, 2010 || Mount Lemmon || Mount Lemmon Survey ||  || align=right | 1.3 km || 
|-id=350 bgcolor=#E9E9E9
| 547350 ||  || — || October 21, 2006 || Lulin || LUSS ||  || align=right | 1.5 km || 
|-id=351 bgcolor=#d6d6d6
| 547351 ||  || — || March 4, 2008 || Mount Lemmon || Mount Lemmon Survey ||  || align=right | 2.5 km || 
|-id=352 bgcolor=#fefefe
| 547352 ||  || — || June 5, 2014 || Haleakala || Pan-STARRS ||  || align=right data-sort-value="0.91" | 910 m || 
|-id=353 bgcolor=#d6d6d6
| 547353 ||  || — || March 10, 2015 || Haleakala || Pan-STARRS || 7:4 || align=right | 3.3 km || 
|-id=354 bgcolor=#E9E9E9
| 547354 ||  || — || November 3, 2011 || Mount Lemmon || Mount Lemmon Survey ||  || align=right | 1.6 km || 
|-id=355 bgcolor=#E9E9E9
| 547355 ||  || — || June 21, 2010 || Mount Lemmon || Mount Lemmon Survey ||  || align=right | 1.8 km || 
|-id=356 bgcolor=#E9E9E9
| 547356 ||  || — || October 26, 2016 || Haleakala || Pan-STARRS ||  || align=right | 2.0 km || 
|-id=357 bgcolor=#E9E9E9
| 547357 ||  || — || May 7, 2014 || Haleakala || Pan-STARRS ||  || align=right | 1.6 km || 
|-id=358 bgcolor=#E9E9E9
| 547358 ||  || — || July 8, 2010 || WISE || WISE ||  || align=right | 2.4 km || 
|-id=359 bgcolor=#d6d6d6
| 547359 ||  || — || September 3, 2005 || Palomar || NEAT ||  || align=right | 2.0 km || 
|-id=360 bgcolor=#E9E9E9
| 547360 ||  || — || July 13, 2010 || WISE || WISE ||  || align=right | 1.8 km || 
|-id=361 bgcolor=#E9E9E9
| 547361 ||  || — || December 13, 2006 || Mount Lemmon || Mount Lemmon Survey ||  || align=right | 1.7 km || 
|-id=362 bgcolor=#E9E9E9
| 547362 ||  || — || December 14, 2006 || Kitt Peak || Spacewatch ||  || align=right | 2.4 km || 
|-id=363 bgcolor=#E9E9E9
| 547363 ||  || — || November 7, 2015 || Mount Lemmon || Mount Lemmon Survey ||  || align=right | 1.3 km || 
|-id=364 bgcolor=#E9E9E9
| 547364 ||  || — || June 21, 2014 || Haleakala || Pan-STARRS ||  || align=right | 1.0 km || 
|-id=365 bgcolor=#E9E9E9
| 547365 ||  || — || August 20, 2014 || Haleakala || Pan-STARRS ||  || align=right | 1.9 km || 
|-id=366 bgcolor=#d6d6d6
| 547366 ||  || — || April 1, 2003 || Apache Point || SDSS Collaboration || 7:4 || align=right | 4.0 km || 
|-id=367 bgcolor=#d6d6d6
| 547367 ||  || — || May 6, 2014 || Haleakala || Pan-STARRS ||  || align=right | 2.2 km || 
|-id=368 bgcolor=#d6d6d6
| 547368 ||  || — || December 18, 2007 || Mount Lemmon || Mount Lemmon Survey || 7:4 || align=right | 4.1 km || 
|-id=369 bgcolor=#fefefe
| 547369 ||  || — || July 19, 2010 || Siding Spring || SSS ||  || align=right data-sort-value="0.86" | 860 m || 
|-id=370 bgcolor=#E9E9E9
| 547370 ||  || — || October 19, 2006 || Catalina || CSS ||  || align=right | 2.6 km || 
|-id=371 bgcolor=#E9E9E9
| 547371 ||  || — || July 5, 2010 || Kitt Peak || Spacewatch ||  || align=right | 1.4 km || 
|-id=372 bgcolor=#E9E9E9
| 547372 ||  || — || June 20, 2010 || Catalina || CSS ||  || align=right | 2.2 km || 
|-id=373 bgcolor=#E9E9E9
| 547373 ||  || — || July 22, 2006 || Mount Lemmon || Mount Lemmon Survey ||  || align=right | 1.5 km || 
|-id=374 bgcolor=#E9E9E9
| 547374 ||  || — || August 6, 2010 || Kitt Peak || Spacewatch ||  || align=right | 2.0 km || 
|-id=375 bgcolor=#C7FF8F
| 547375 ||  || — || November 3, 2013 || Cerro Tololo-DECam || S. S. Sheppard, C. Trujillo || centaur || align=right | 120 km || 
|-id=376 bgcolor=#E9E9E9
| 547376 ||  || — || August 13, 2010 || Kitt Peak || Spacewatch ||  || align=right | 1.7 km || 
|-id=377 bgcolor=#E9E9E9
| 547377 ||  || — || August 13, 2010 || Kitt Peak || Spacewatch ||  || align=right | 1.1 km || 
|-id=378 bgcolor=#fefefe
| 547378 ||  || — || August 19, 2010 || Kitt Peak || Spacewatch ||  || align=right data-sort-value="0.78" | 780 m || 
|-id=379 bgcolor=#FA8072
| 547379 ||  || — || August 30, 2010 || La Sagra || OAM Obs. ||  || align=right data-sort-value="0.65" | 650 m || 
|-id=380 bgcolor=#fefefe
| 547380 ||  || — || June 14, 2010 || Mount Lemmon || Mount Lemmon Survey ||  || align=right data-sort-value="0.65" | 650 m || 
|-id=381 bgcolor=#E9E9E9
| 547381 ||  || — || March 16, 2004 || Siding Spring || SSS ||  || align=right | 3.0 km || 
|-id=382 bgcolor=#E9E9E9
| 547382 ||  || — || December 4, 1996 || Kitt Peak || Spacewatch ||  || align=right | 2.4 km || 
|-id=383 bgcolor=#E9E9E9
| 547383 ||  || — || February 7, 2003 || Desert Eagle || W. K. Y. Yeung ||  || align=right | 3.1 km || 
|-id=384 bgcolor=#E9E9E9
| 547384 ||  || — || December 16, 2007 || Mount Lemmon || Mount Lemmon Survey ||  || align=right | 1.6 km || 
|-id=385 bgcolor=#E9E9E9
| 547385 ||  || — || September 2, 2010 || Mount Lemmon || Mount Lemmon Survey ||  || align=right | 1.9 km || 
|-id=386 bgcolor=#d6d6d6
| 547386 ||  || — || September 2, 2010 || Mount Lemmon || Mount Lemmon Survey ||  || align=right | 2.1 km || 
|-id=387 bgcolor=#E9E9E9
| 547387 ||  || — || August 30, 2006 || Anderson Mesa || LONEOS ||  || align=right | 1.2 km || 
|-id=388 bgcolor=#E9E9E9
| 547388 ||  || — || December 18, 2007 || Mount Lemmon || Mount Lemmon Survey ||  || align=right | 1.4 km || 
|-id=389 bgcolor=#d6d6d6
| 547389 ||  || — || September 2, 2010 || Mount Lemmon || Mount Lemmon Survey ||  || align=right | 1.8 km || 
|-id=390 bgcolor=#E9E9E9
| 547390 ||  || — || September 30, 2006 || Mount Lemmon || Mount Lemmon Survey ||  || align=right | 2.1 km || 
|-id=391 bgcolor=#E9E9E9
| 547391 ||  || — || September 1, 2010 || Mount Lemmon || Mount Lemmon Survey ||  || align=right | 2.2 km || 
|-id=392 bgcolor=#fefefe
| 547392 ||  || — || August 20, 2000 || Kitt Peak || Spacewatch ||  || align=right data-sort-value="0.86" | 860 m || 
|-id=393 bgcolor=#E9E9E9
| 547393 ||  || — || February 22, 2003 || Palomar || NEAT || JUN || align=right data-sort-value="0.99" | 990 m || 
|-id=394 bgcolor=#E9E9E9
| 547394 ||  || — || October 20, 2006 || Mount Lemmon || Mount Lemmon Survey ||  || align=right | 1.4 km || 
|-id=395 bgcolor=#E9E9E9
| 547395 ||  || — || May 26, 2009 || Kitt Peak || Spacewatch ||  || align=right | 1.5 km || 
|-id=396 bgcolor=#E9E9E9
| 547396 ||  || — || September 1, 2010 || Mount Lemmon || Mount Lemmon Survey ||  || align=right | 1.3 km || 
|-id=397 bgcolor=#E9E9E9
| 547397 ||  || — || September 1, 2010 || Mount Lemmon || Mount Lemmon Survey ||  || align=right | 2.5 km || 
|-id=398 bgcolor=#E9E9E9
| 547398 Turánpál ||  ||  || September 3, 2010 || Piszkesteto || Z. Kuli ||  || align=right | 2.2 km || 
|-id=399 bgcolor=#E9E9E9
| 547399 ||  || — || September 4, 2010 || Sierra Stars || M. Ory ||  || align=right | 3.0 km || 
|-id=400 bgcolor=#E9E9E9
| 547400 ||  || — || September 4, 2010 || Piszkesteto || Z. Kuli ||  || align=right | 2.0 km || 
|}

547401–547500 

|-bgcolor=#E9E9E9
| 547401 ||  || — || October 21, 2006 || Lulin || LUSS ||  || align=right | 2.4 km || 
|-id=402 bgcolor=#E9E9E9
| 547402 ||  || — || September 2, 2010 || Mount Lemmon || Mount Lemmon Survey ||  || align=right | 1.9 km || 
|-id=403 bgcolor=#E9E9E9
| 547403 ||  || — || September 4, 2010 || Kitt Peak || Spacewatch ||  || align=right | 1.7 km || 
|-id=404 bgcolor=#d6d6d6
| 547404 ||  || — || August 26, 2005 || Palomar || NEAT ||  || align=right | 2.3 km || 
|-id=405 bgcolor=#E9E9E9
| 547405 ||  || — || September 4, 2010 || Kitt Peak || Spacewatch ||  || align=right | 1.9 km || 
|-id=406 bgcolor=#E9E9E9
| 547406 ||  || — || December 29, 2003 || Kitt Peak || Spacewatch ||  || align=right | 1.8 km || 
|-id=407 bgcolor=#fefefe
| 547407 ||  || — || September 6, 2010 || SM Montmagastrell || J. M. Bosch ||  || align=right data-sort-value="0.75" | 750 m || 
|-id=408 bgcolor=#E9E9E9
| 547408 ||  || — || December 31, 2007 || Kitt Peak || Spacewatch ||  || align=right | 1.6 km || 
|-id=409 bgcolor=#E9E9E9
| 547409 ||  || — || September 4, 2010 || Kitt Peak || Spacewatch ||  || align=right | 2.3 km || 
|-id=410 bgcolor=#E9E9E9
| 547410 ||  || — || November 11, 2006 || Mount Lemmon || Mount Lemmon Survey ||  || align=right | 1.9 km || 
|-id=411 bgcolor=#E9E9E9
| 547411 ||  || — || September 5, 2010 || Mount Lemmon || Mount Lemmon Survey ||  || align=right | 2.2 km || 
|-id=412 bgcolor=#E9E9E9
| 547412 ||  || — || March 1, 2008 || Kitt Peak || Spacewatch ||  || align=right | 2.4 km || 
|-id=413 bgcolor=#E9E9E9
| 547413 ||  || — || October 31, 2006 || Mount Lemmon || Mount Lemmon Survey ||  || align=right | 1.7 km || 
|-id=414 bgcolor=#d6d6d6
| 547414 ||  || — || September 4, 2010 || Mount Lemmon || Mount Lemmon Survey ||  || align=right | 2.9 km || 
|-id=415 bgcolor=#E9E9E9
| 547415 ||  || — || January 8, 2002 || Apache Point || SDSS Collaboration || GEF || align=right | 1.4 km || 
|-id=416 bgcolor=#E9E9E9
| 547416 ||  || — || September 8, 2010 || Dauban || C. Rinner, F. Kugel ||  || align=right | 2.0 km || 
|-id=417 bgcolor=#fefefe
| 547417 ||  || — || October 12, 2007 || Mount Lemmon || Mount Lemmon Survey ||  || align=right data-sort-value="0.90" | 900 m || 
|-id=418 bgcolor=#E9E9E9
| 547418 ||  || — || July 12, 2005 || Mount Lemmon || Mount Lemmon Survey ||  || align=right | 2.5 km || 
|-id=419 bgcolor=#E9E9E9
| 547419 ||  || — || August 9, 2005 || Cerro Tololo || Cerro Tololo Obs. ||  || align=right | 2.2 km || 
|-id=420 bgcolor=#E9E9E9
| 547420 ||  || — || September 3, 2010 || Mount Lemmon || Mount Lemmon Survey ||  || align=right | 1.5 km || 
|-id=421 bgcolor=#fefefe
| 547421 ||  || — || September 6, 2010 || La Sagra || OAM Obs. ||  || align=right data-sort-value="0.65" | 650 m || 
|-id=422 bgcolor=#E9E9E9
| 547422 ||  || — || May 4, 2005 || Palomar || NEAT ||  || align=right | 1.2 km || 
|-id=423 bgcolor=#E9E9E9
| 547423 ||  || — || September 10, 2010 || Kitt Peak || Spacewatch ||  || align=right | 1.9 km || 
|-id=424 bgcolor=#E9E9E9
| 547424 ||  || — || September 16, 2006 || Catalina || CSS ||  || align=right | 1.1 km || 
|-id=425 bgcolor=#E9E9E9
| 547425 ||  || — || September 11, 2010 || Mount Lemmon || Mount Lemmon Survey ||  || align=right data-sort-value="0.96" | 960 m || 
|-id=426 bgcolor=#E9E9E9
| 547426 ||  || — || October 2, 2006 || Mount Lemmon || Mount Lemmon Survey ||  || align=right | 1.8 km || 
|-id=427 bgcolor=#E9E9E9
| 547427 ||  || — || October 20, 2006 || Kitt Peak || Spacewatch ||  || align=right | 2.0 km || 
|-id=428 bgcolor=#E9E9E9
| 547428 ||  || — || September 12, 2010 || Mount Lemmon || Mount Lemmon Survey ||  || align=right | 2.2 km || 
|-id=429 bgcolor=#E9E9E9
| 547429 ||  || — || February 9, 2008 || Kitt Peak || Spacewatch ||  || align=right | 2.0 km || 
|-id=430 bgcolor=#E9E9E9
| 547430 ||  || — || September 10, 2010 || Kitt Peak || Spacewatch ||  || align=right | 1.8 km || 
|-id=431 bgcolor=#E9E9E9
| 547431 ||  || — || September 10, 2010 || Kitt Peak || Spacewatch ||  || align=right | 1.5 km || 
|-id=432 bgcolor=#E9E9E9
| 547432 ||  || — || September 10, 2010 || Kitt Peak || Spacewatch ||  || align=right | 1.2 km || 
|-id=433 bgcolor=#E9E9E9
| 547433 ||  || — || September 10, 2010 || Kitt Peak || Spacewatch ||  || align=right | 1.8 km || 
|-id=434 bgcolor=#E9E9E9
| 547434 ||  || — || September 10, 2010 || Kitt Peak || Spacewatch ||  || align=right | 2.1 km || 
|-id=435 bgcolor=#d6d6d6
| 547435 ||  || — || August 30, 2005 || Kitt Peak || Spacewatch ||  || align=right | 1.8 km || 
|-id=436 bgcolor=#E9E9E9
| 547436 ||  || — || September 10, 2010 || Kitt Peak || Spacewatch || AGN || align=right data-sort-value="0.86" | 860 m || 
|-id=437 bgcolor=#E9E9E9
| 547437 ||  || — || September 10, 2010 || Mount Lemmon || Mount Lemmon Survey ||  || align=right | 2.1 km || 
|-id=438 bgcolor=#d6d6d6
| 547438 ||  || — || September 11, 2010 || Kitt Peak || Spacewatch ||  || align=right | 2.5 km || 
|-id=439 bgcolor=#E9E9E9
| 547439 ||  || — || September 11, 2010 || Kitt Peak || Spacewatch ||  || align=right | 1.5 km || 
|-id=440 bgcolor=#d6d6d6
| 547440 ||  || — || September 11, 2010 || Kitt Peak || Spacewatch ||  || align=right | 2.3 km || 
|-id=441 bgcolor=#E9E9E9
| 547441 ||  || — || September 12, 2010 || Mount Lemmon || Mount Lemmon Survey ||  || align=right | 1.6 km || 
|-id=442 bgcolor=#E9E9E9
| 547442 ||  || — || September 12, 2010 || Mount Lemmon || Mount Lemmon Survey ||  || align=right | 1.6 km || 
|-id=443 bgcolor=#fefefe
| 547443 ||  || — || November 2, 2007 || Mount Lemmon || Mount Lemmon Survey ||  || align=right data-sort-value="0.53" | 530 m || 
|-id=444 bgcolor=#E9E9E9
| 547444 ||  || — || September 10, 2010 || Mount Lemmon || Mount Lemmon Survey ||  || align=right | 2.1 km || 
|-id=445 bgcolor=#E9E9E9
| 547445 ||  || — || October 26, 2006 || Lulin || LUSS ||  || align=right | 1.6 km || 
|-id=446 bgcolor=#E9E9E9
| 547446 ||  || — || September 14, 2010 || Kitt Peak || Spacewatch ||  || align=right | 2.1 km || 
|-id=447 bgcolor=#fefefe
| 547447 ||  || — || September 14, 2010 || Kitt Peak || Spacewatch ||  || align=right data-sort-value="0.65" | 650 m || 
|-id=448 bgcolor=#fefefe
| 547448 ||  || — || September 6, 2010 || La Sagra || OAM Obs. ||  || align=right data-sort-value="0.58" | 580 m || 
|-id=449 bgcolor=#E9E9E9
| 547449 ||  || — || September 15, 2010 || Kitt Peak || Spacewatch ||  || align=right | 1.8 km || 
|-id=450 bgcolor=#E9E9E9
| 547450 ||  || — || September 15, 2010 || Kitt Peak || Spacewatch ||  || align=right | 1.7 km || 
|-id=451 bgcolor=#d6d6d6
| 547451 ||  || — || September 15, 2010 || Kitt Peak || Spacewatch || SHU3:2 || align=right | 6.4 km || 
|-id=452 bgcolor=#E9E9E9
| 547452 ||  || — || September 15, 2010 || Kitt Peak || Spacewatch ||  || align=right | 1.6 km || 
|-id=453 bgcolor=#E9E9E9
| 547453 ||  || — || March 1, 2008 || Kitt Peak || Spacewatch ||  || align=right | 1.9 km || 
|-id=454 bgcolor=#E9E9E9
| 547454 ||  || — || September 15, 2010 || Kitt Peak || Spacewatch ||  || align=right | 2.2 km || 
|-id=455 bgcolor=#E9E9E9
| 547455 ||  || — || August 25, 2001 || Kitt Peak || Spacewatch ||  || align=right | 3.0 km || 
|-id=456 bgcolor=#E9E9E9
| 547456 ||  || — || September 3, 2010 || Mount Lemmon || Mount Lemmon Survey ||  || align=right | 1.8 km || 
|-id=457 bgcolor=#d6d6d6
| 547457 ||  || — || August 10, 2010 || Kitt Peak || Spacewatch ||  || align=right | 2.7 km || 
|-id=458 bgcolor=#E9E9E9
| 547458 ||  || — || June 20, 2010 || Mount Lemmon || Mount Lemmon Survey ||  || align=right | 1.5 km || 
|-id=459 bgcolor=#E9E9E9
| 547459 ||  || — || September 4, 2010 || Mount Lemmon || Mount Lemmon Survey ||  || align=right | 1.8 km || 
|-id=460 bgcolor=#d6d6d6
| 547460 ||  || — || September 9, 2010 || Bisei SG Center || N. Hashimoto, T. Sakamoto ||  || align=right | 3.1 km || 
|-id=461 bgcolor=#E9E9E9
| 547461 ||  || — || September 2, 2010 || Mount Lemmon || Mount Lemmon Survey ||  || align=right | 1.4 km || 
|-id=462 bgcolor=#E9E9E9
| 547462 ||  || — || October 2, 2006 || Mount Lemmon || Mount Lemmon Survey ||  || align=right | 1.3 km || 
|-id=463 bgcolor=#E9E9E9
| 547463 ||  || — || September 5, 2010 || Mount Lemmon || Mount Lemmon Survey ||  || align=right | 2.3 km || 
|-id=464 bgcolor=#E9E9E9
| 547464 ||  || — || September 11, 2010 || Kitt Peak || Spacewatch ||  || align=right | 1.5 km || 
|-id=465 bgcolor=#E9E9E9
| 547465 ||  || — || September 28, 2001 || Palomar || NEAT ||  || align=right | 1.9 km || 
|-id=466 bgcolor=#E9E9E9
| 547466 ||  || — || September 1, 2005 || Palomar || NEAT ||  || align=right | 2.3 km || 
|-id=467 bgcolor=#d6d6d6
| 547467 ||  || — || October 5, 2005 || Catalina || CSS ||  || align=right | 2.8 km || 
|-id=468 bgcolor=#E9E9E9
| 547468 ||  || — || September 11, 2010 || Kitt Peak || Spacewatch ||  || align=right | 1.3 km || 
|-id=469 bgcolor=#E9E9E9
| 547469 ||  || — || September 10, 2010 || Kitt Peak || Spacewatch ||  || align=right | 1.9 km || 
|-id=470 bgcolor=#fefefe
| 547470 ||  || — || November 7, 2007 || Kitt Peak || Spacewatch ||  || align=right data-sort-value="0.65" | 650 m || 
|-id=471 bgcolor=#E9E9E9
| 547471 ||  || — || October 2, 2010 || Nogales || M. Schwartz, P. R. Holvorcem ||  || align=right | 2.2 km || 
|-id=472 bgcolor=#fefefe
| 547472 ||  || — || July 23, 2003 || Palomar || NEAT ||  || align=right data-sort-value="0.74" | 740 m || 
|-id=473 bgcolor=#d6d6d6
| 547473 ||  || — || October 19, 2010 || Mount Lemmon || Mount Lemmon Survey ||  || align=right | 3.0 km || 
|-id=474 bgcolor=#E9E9E9
| 547474 ||  || — || December 13, 2006 || Catalina || CSS ||  || align=right | 3.6 km || 
|-id=475 bgcolor=#E9E9E9
| 547475 ||  || — || September 16, 2010 || Kitt Peak || Spacewatch || AGN || align=right | 1.2 km || 
|-id=476 bgcolor=#E9E9E9
| 547476 ||  || — || September 16, 2010 || Kitt Peak || Spacewatch || AGN || align=right | 1.3 km || 
|-id=477 bgcolor=#d6d6d6
| 547477 ||  || — || March 8, 2003 || Kitt Peak || Spacewatch ||  || align=right | 2.3 km || 
|-id=478 bgcolor=#E9E9E9
| 547478 ||  || — || September 15, 2010 || Kitt Peak || Spacewatch ||  || align=right | 2.1 km || 
|-id=479 bgcolor=#E9E9E9
| 547479 ||  || — || January 25, 2009 || Kitt Peak || Spacewatch ||  || align=right data-sort-value="0.90" | 900 m || 
|-id=480 bgcolor=#fefefe
| 547480 ||  || — || September 15, 2010 || Mount Lemmon || Mount Lemmon Survey ||  || align=right data-sort-value="0.52" | 520 m || 
|-id=481 bgcolor=#E9E9E9
| 547481 ||  || — || September 3, 2014 || Mount Lemmon || Mount Lemmon Survey ||  || align=right data-sort-value="0.89" | 890 m || 
|-id=482 bgcolor=#E9E9E9
| 547482 ||  || — || November 14, 2015 || Mount Lemmon || Mount Lemmon Survey ||  || align=right | 2.1 km || 
|-id=483 bgcolor=#E9E9E9
| 547483 ||  || — || September 3, 2010 || Mount Lemmon || Mount Lemmon Survey ||  || align=right | 1.4 km || 
|-id=484 bgcolor=#d6d6d6
| 547484 ||  || — || September 5, 2010 || Mount Lemmon || Mount Lemmon Survey ||  || align=right | 3.1 km || 
|-id=485 bgcolor=#E9E9E9
| 547485 ||  || — || September 15, 2010 || Kitt Peak || Spacewatch ||  || align=right | 1.7 km || 
|-id=486 bgcolor=#E9E9E9
| 547486 ||  || — || September 3, 2010 || Mount Lemmon || Mount Lemmon Survey ||  || align=right | 1.9 km || 
|-id=487 bgcolor=#E9E9E9
| 547487 ||  || — || October 13, 2006 || Kitt Peak || Spacewatch ||  || align=right | 1.3 km || 
|-id=488 bgcolor=#E9E9E9
| 547488 ||  || — || September 14, 2010 || Mount Lemmon || Mount Lemmon Survey ||  || align=right | 1.5 km || 
|-id=489 bgcolor=#E9E9E9
| 547489 ||  || — || August 13, 2010 || Kitt Peak || Spacewatch ||  || align=right | 1.7 km || 
|-id=490 bgcolor=#E9E9E9
| 547490 ||  || — || June 21, 2014 || Mount Lemmon || Mount Lemmon Survey ||  || align=right | 1.3 km || 
|-id=491 bgcolor=#E9E9E9
| 547491 ||  || — || February 14, 2013 || Haleakala || Pan-STARRS ||  || align=right | 1.4 km || 
|-id=492 bgcolor=#E9E9E9
| 547492 ||  || — || September 15, 2010 || Mount Lemmon || Mount Lemmon Survey ||  || align=right | 1.6 km || 
|-id=493 bgcolor=#E9E9E9
| 547493 ||  || — || September 2, 2010 || Mount Lemmon || Mount Lemmon Survey ||  || align=right | 1.4 km || 
|-id=494 bgcolor=#E9E9E9
| 547494 ||  || — || September 6, 2010 || Mount Lemmon || Mount Lemmon Survey ||  || align=right | 1.6 km || 
|-id=495 bgcolor=#E9E9E9
| 547495 ||  || — || September 4, 2010 || Kitt Peak || Spacewatch ||  || align=right | 1.6 km || 
|-id=496 bgcolor=#d6d6d6
| 547496 ||  || — || September 15, 2010 || Mount Lemmon || Mount Lemmon Survey ||  || align=right | 2.4 km || 
|-id=497 bgcolor=#d6d6d6
| 547497 ||  || — || September 3, 2010 || Mount Lemmon || Mount Lemmon Survey ||  || align=right | 2.3 km || 
|-id=498 bgcolor=#d6d6d6
| 547498 ||  || — || September 9, 2010 || Kitt Peak || Spacewatch ||  || align=right | 1.8 km || 
|-id=499 bgcolor=#d6d6d6
| 547499 ||  || — || August 6, 2005 || Palomar || NEAT ||  || align=right | 2.8 km || 
|-id=500 bgcolor=#E9E9E9
| 547500 ||  || — || February 10, 2008 || Kitt Peak || Spacewatch ||  || align=right | 1.8 km || 
|}

547501–547600 

|-bgcolor=#FA8072
| 547501 ||  || — || September 17, 2010 || Catalina || CSS ||  || align=right data-sort-value="0.59" | 590 m || 
|-id=502 bgcolor=#fefefe
| 547502 ||  || — || December 3, 2007 || Lulin || LUSS ||  || align=right data-sort-value="0.71" | 710 m || 
|-id=503 bgcolor=#E9E9E9
| 547503 ||  || — || July 31, 2005 || Palomar || NEAT ||  || align=right | 2.2 km || 
|-id=504 bgcolor=#E9E9E9
| 547504 ||  || — || August 24, 2001 || Kitt Peak || Spacewatch ||  || align=right | 2.0 km || 
|-id=505 bgcolor=#fefefe
| 547505 ||  || — || September 17, 2010 || Kitt Peak || Spacewatch ||  || align=right data-sort-value="0.57" | 570 m || 
|-id=506 bgcolor=#E9E9E9
| 547506 ||  || — || September 17, 2010 || Mount Lemmon || Mount Lemmon Survey ||  || align=right | 2.0 km || 
|-id=507 bgcolor=#E9E9E9
| 547507 ||  || — || September 5, 2010 || Mount Lemmon || Mount Lemmon Survey ||  || align=right | 1.5 km || 
|-id=508 bgcolor=#d6d6d6
| 547508 ||  || — || September 26, 2010 || SM Montmagastrell || J. M. Bosch || 615 || align=right | 1.1 km || 
|-id=509 bgcolor=#E9E9E9
| 547509 ||  || — || March 8, 2008 || Mount Lemmon || Mount Lemmon Survey ||  || align=right | 2.2 km || 
|-id=510 bgcolor=#d6d6d6
| 547510 ||  || — || September 10, 2010 || Catalina || CSS ||  || align=right | 2.6 km || 
|-id=511 bgcolor=#fefefe
| 547511 ||  || — || September 30, 2010 || Mount Lemmon || Mount Lemmon Survey ||  || align=right data-sort-value="0.49" | 490 m || 
|-id=512 bgcolor=#E9E9E9
| 547512 ||  || — || September 30, 2010 || Piszkesteto || Z. Kuli, K. Sárneczky ||  || align=right | 1.8 km || 
|-id=513 bgcolor=#E9E9E9
| 547513 ||  || — || August 25, 2001 || Anderson Mesa || LONEOS ||  || align=right | 2.5 km || 
|-id=514 bgcolor=#E9E9E9
| 547514 ||  || — || September 9, 2010 || Kitt Peak || Spacewatch ||  || align=right | 2.1 km || 
|-id=515 bgcolor=#E9E9E9
| 547515 ||  || — || September 16, 2010 || Mount Lemmon || Mount Lemmon Survey ||  || align=right | 2.0 km || 
|-id=516 bgcolor=#E9E9E9
| 547516 ||  || — || January 12, 2008 || Kitt Peak || Spacewatch ||  || align=right | 2.5 km || 
|-id=517 bgcolor=#E9E9E9
| 547517 ||  || — || September 18, 2010 || Mount Lemmon || Mount Lemmon Survey ||  || align=right | 1.6 km || 
|-id=518 bgcolor=#E9E9E9
| 547518 ||  || — || September 16, 2010 || Mount Lemmon || Mount Lemmon Survey ||  || align=right | 1.7 km || 
|-id=519 bgcolor=#E9E9E9
| 547519 ||  || — || September 30, 2010 || Mount Lemmon || Mount Lemmon Survey ||  || align=right | 1.8 km || 
|-id=520 bgcolor=#E9E9E9
| 547520 ||  || — || September 29, 2010 || Mount Lemmon || Mount Lemmon Survey ||  || align=right | 1.8 km || 
|-id=521 bgcolor=#fefefe
| 547521 ||  || — || August 10, 2010 || Kitt Peak || Spacewatch ||  || align=right data-sort-value="0.68" | 680 m || 
|-id=522 bgcolor=#E9E9E9
| 547522 ||  || — || September 15, 2010 || Kitt Peak || Spacewatch ||  || align=right | 1.5 km || 
|-id=523 bgcolor=#fefefe
| 547523 ||  || — || December 16, 2007 || Mount Lemmon || Mount Lemmon Survey ||  || align=right data-sort-value="0.94" | 940 m || 
|-id=524 bgcolor=#E9E9E9
| 547524 ||  || — || July 12, 2005 || Mount Lemmon || Mount Lemmon Survey ||  || align=right | 2.2 km || 
|-id=525 bgcolor=#fefefe
| 547525 ||  || — || October 1, 2010 || La Sagra || OAM Obs. ||  || align=right data-sort-value="0.65" | 650 m || 
|-id=526 bgcolor=#E9E9E9
| 547526 ||  || — || September 11, 2010 || Bisei SG Center || K. Nishiyama, T. Sakamoto ||  || align=right | 2.0 km || 
|-id=527 bgcolor=#fefefe
| 547527 ||  || — || February 9, 2005 || Mount Lemmon || Mount Lemmon Survey ||  || align=right data-sort-value="0.54" | 540 m || 
|-id=528 bgcolor=#E9E9E9
| 547528 ||  || — || October 3, 2010 || Kitt Peak || Spacewatch ||  || align=right | 1.7 km || 
|-id=529 bgcolor=#E9E9E9
| 547529 ||  || — || September 5, 2010 || Bergisch Gladbach || W. Bickel ||  || align=right | 2.4 km || 
|-id=530 bgcolor=#fefefe
| 547530 ||  || — || September 16, 2010 || Kitt Peak || Spacewatch ||  || align=right data-sort-value="0.71" | 710 m || 
|-id=531 bgcolor=#E9E9E9
| 547531 ||  || — || July 8, 2010 || Kitt Peak || Spacewatch ||  || align=right | 2.6 km || 
|-id=532 bgcolor=#E9E9E9
| 547532 ||  || — || November 21, 2007 || Mount Lemmon || Mount Lemmon Survey ||  || align=right | 2.1 km || 
|-id=533 bgcolor=#E9E9E9
| 547533 ||  || — || September 2, 2010 || Mount Lemmon || Mount Lemmon Survey ||  || align=right | 1.7 km || 
|-id=534 bgcolor=#E9E9E9
| 547534 ||  || — || October 2, 2010 || Kitt Peak || Spacewatch ||  || align=right | 1.6 km || 
|-id=535 bgcolor=#E9E9E9
| 547535 ||  || — || September 5, 1996 || Kitt Peak || Spacewatch || AGN || align=right data-sort-value="0.99" | 990 m || 
|-id=536 bgcolor=#E9E9E9
| 547536 ||  || — || September 4, 2010 || Kitt Peak || Spacewatch ||  || align=right | 1.4 km || 
|-id=537 bgcolor=#E9E9E9
| 547537 ||  || — || September 17, 2010 || Kitt Peak || Spacewatch || HOF || align=right | 2.2 km || 
|-id=538 bgcolor=#d6d6d6
| 547538 ||  || — || October 9, 2005 || Kitt Peak || Spacewatch ||  || align=right | 2.0 km || 
|-id=539 bgcolor=#E9E9E9
| 547539 ||  || — || October 19, 2006 || Catalina || CSS ||  || align=right | 1.7 km || 
|-id=540 bgcolor=#E9E9E9
| 547540 ||  || — || August 12, 2010 || La Sagra || OAM Obs. || EUN || align=right | 1.3 km || 
|-id=541 bgcolor=#E9E9E9
| 547541 ||  || — || October 20, 2001 || Palomar || NEAT ||  || align=right | 3.0 km || 
|-id=542 bgcolor=#E9E9E9
| 547542 ||  || — || September 19, 2010 || Kitt Peak || Spacewatch ||  || align=right | 1.6 km || 
|-id=543 bgcolor=#E9E9E9
| 547543 ||  || — || September 10, 2010 || Kitt Peak || Spacewatch ||  || align=right | 1.6 km || 
|-id=544 bgcolor=#E9E9E9
| 547544 ||  || — || September 14, 2010 || Kitt Peak || Spacewatch ||  || align=right | 1.7 km || 
|-id=545 bgcolor=#E9E9E9
| 547545 ||  || — || October 2, 2010 || Kitt Peak || Spacewatch ||  || align=right | 1.8 km || 
|-id=546 bgcolor=#E9E9E9
| 547546 ||  || — || October 3, 2010 || Kitt Peak || Spacewatch ||  || align=right | 1.6 km || 
|-id=547 bgcolor=#d6d6d6
| 547547 ||  || — || October 3, 2010 || Kitt Peak || Spacewatch ||  || align=right | 2.3 km || 
|-id=548 bgcolor=#E9E9E9
| 547548 ||  || — || October 3, 2010 || Kitt Peak || Spacewatch ||  || align=right | 1.3 km || 
|-id=549 bgcolor=#E9E9E9
| 547549 ||  || — || September 10, 2010 || Mount Lemmon || Mount Lemmon Survey ||  || align=right | 1.9 km || 
|-id=550 bgcolor=#E9E9E9
| 547550 ||  || — || September 17, 2010 || Mount Lemmon || Mount Lemmon Survey ||  || align=right | 1.6 km || 
|-id=551 bgcolor=#E9E9E9
| 547551 ||  || — || February 13, 2008 || Mount Lemmon || Mount Lemmon Survey ||  || align=right | 2.3 km || 
|-id=552 bgcolor=#E9E9E9
| 547552 ||  || — || October 3, 2010 || Kitt Peak || Spacewatch ||  || align=right | 1.7 km || 
|-id=553 bgcolor=#E9E9E9
| 547553 ||  || — || November 16, 2006 || Kitt Peak || Spacewatch ||  || align=right | 1.8 km || 
|-id=554 bgcolor=#fefefe
| 547554 ||  || — || October 9, 2007 || Kitt Peak || Spacewatch ||  || align=right data-sort-value="0.57" | 570 m || 
|-id=555 bgcolor=#E9E9E9
| 547555 ||  || — || August 6, 2005 || Palomar || NEAT ||  || align=right | 2.3 km || 
|-id=556 bgcolor=#E9E9E9
| 547556 ||  || — || September 18, 2010 || Kitt Peak || Spacewatch ||  || align=right | 1.6 km || 
|-id=557 bgcolor=#E9E9E9
| 547557 ||  || — || March 1, 2008 || Mount Lemmon || Mount Lemmon Survey ||  || align=right | 1.6 km || 
|-id=558 bgcolor=#E9E9E9
| 547558 ||  || — || September 30, 2010 || Catalina || CSS ||  || align=right | 2.6 km || 
|-id=559 bgcolor=#d6d6d6
| 547559 ||  || — || September 26, 2005 || Catalina || CSS ||  || align=right | 2.2 km || 
|-id=560 bgcolor=#E9E9E9
| 547560 ||  || — || October 21, 2006 || Kitt Peak || Spacewatch ||  || align=right | 1.8 km || 
|-id=561 bgcolor=#E9E9E9
| 547561 ||  || — || September 19, 2010 || Kitt Peak || Spacewatch ||  || align=right | 1.5 km || 
|-id=562 bgcolor=#E9E9E9
| 547562 ||  || — || October 23, 2006 || Kitt Peak || Spacewatch ||  || align=right | 1.3 km || 
|-id=563 bgcolor=#E9E9E9
| 547563 ||  || — || March 30, 2008 || Kitt Peak || Spacewatch ||  || align=right | 1.8 km || 
|-id=564 bgcolor=#d6d6d6
| 547564 ||  || — || December 1, 2005 || Kitt Peak || L. H. Wasserman, R. Millis || KOR || align=right | 1.3 km || 
|-id=565 bgcolor=#E9E9E9
| 547565 ||  || — || September 13, 2005 || Kitt Peak || Spacewatch ||  || align=right | 2.0 km || 
|-id=566 bgcolor=#E9E9E9
| 547566 ||  || — || September 28, 2001 || Palomar || NEAT ||  || align=right | 2.1 km || 
|-id=567 bgcolor=#E9E9E9
| 547567 ||  || — || August 9, 2005 || Cerro Tololo || Cerro Tololo Obs. ||  || align=right | 1.8 km || 
|-id=568 bgcolor=#E9E9E9
| 547568 ||  || — || October 21, 2001 || Kitt Peak || Spacewatch ||  || align=right | 1.5 km || 
|-id=569 bgcolor=#E9E9E9
| 547569 ||  || — || October 9, 2010 || Kitt Peak || Spacewatch ||  || align=right | 1.8 km || 
|-id=570 bgcolor=#E9E9E9
| 547570 ||  || — || September 29, 2010 || Kitt Peak || Spacewatch || HOF || align=right | 2.0 km || 
|-id=571 bgcolor=#E9E9E9
| 547571 ||  || — || October 9, 2010 || Mount Lemmon || Mount Lemmon Survey ||  || align=right | 1.8 km || 
|-id=572 bgcolor=#E9E9E9
| 547572 ||  || — || December 12, 2006 || Kitt Peak || Spacewatch ||  || align=right | 1.7 km || 
|-id=573 bgcolor=#E9E9E9
| 547573 ||  || — || September 15, 2010 || Mount Lemmon || Mount Lemmon Survey ||  || align=right | 1.5 km || 
|-id=574 bgcolor=#E9E9E9
| 547574 ||  || — || November 14, 2006 || Mount Lemmon || Mount Lemmon Survey ||  || align=right | 1.8 km || 
|-id=575 bgcolor=#E9E9E9
| 547575 ||  || — || October 10, 2010 || Mount Lemmon || Mount Lemmon Survey ||  || align=right | 1.5 km || 
|-id=576 bgcolor=#E9E9E9
| 547576 ||  || — || October 10, 2001 || Palomar || NEAT ||  || align=right | 2.0 km || 
|-id=577 bgcolor=#E9E9E9
| 547577 ||  || — || February 13, 2008 || Mount Lemmon || Mount Lemmon Survey ||  || align=right | 2.3 km || 
|-id=578 bgcolor=#E9E9E9
| 547578 ||  || — || October 11, 2010 || Catalina || CSS ||  || align=right | 1.8 km || 
|-id=579 bgcolor=#fefefe
| 547579 ||  || — || September 18, 2010 || Kitt Peak || Spacewatch ||  || align=right data-sort-value="0.62" | 620 m || 
|-id=580 bgcolor=#E9E9E9
| 547580 ||  || — || September 14, 2010 || Kitt Peak || Spacewatch ||  || align=right | 1.7 km || 
|-id=581 bgcolor=#E9E9E9
| 547581 ||  || — || October 11, 2010 || Mount Lemmon || Mount Lemmon Survey ||  || align=right | 2.4 km || 
|-id=582 bgcolor=#d6d6d6
| 547582 ||  || — || October 11, 2010 || Mount Lemmon || Mount Lemmon Survey ||  || align=right | 2.2 km || 
|-id=583 bgcolor=#E9E9E9
| 547583 ||  || — || October 11, 2010 || Mount Lemmon || Mount Lemmon Survey ||  || align=right | 1.9 km || 
|-id=584 bgcolor=#fefefe
| 547584 ||  || — || October 11, 2010 || Mount Lemmon || Mount Lemmon Survey || H || align=right data-sort-value="0.45" | 450 m || 
|-id=585 bgcolor=#d6d6d6
| 547585 ||  || — || January 24, 2007 || Mount Lemmon || Mount Lemmon Survey ||  || align=right | 2.3 km || 
|-id=586 bgcolor=#E9E9E9
| 547586 ||  || — || August 29, 2005 || Kitt Peak || Spacewatch ||  || align=right | 1.7 km || 
|-id=587 bgcolor=#E9E9E9
| 547587 ||  || — || October 11, 2010 || Mount Lemmon || Mount Lemmon Survey ||  || align=right | 1.8 km || 
|-id=588 bgcolor=#E9E9E9
| 547588 ||  || — || October 11, 2010 || Mount Lemmon || Mount Lemmon Survey ||  || align=right | 2.2 km || 
|-id=589 bgcolor=#E9E9E9
| 547589 ||  || — || March 27, 2008 || Mount Lemmon || Mount Lemmon Survey ||  || align=right | 1.9 km || 
|-id=590 bgcolor=#E9E9E9
| 547590 ||  || — || October 18, 2001 || Palomar || NEAT ||  || align=right | 1.8 km || 
|-id=591 bgcolor=#E9E9E9
| 547591 ||  || — || July 30, 2005 || Palomar || NEAT ||  || align=right | 2.1 km || 
|-id=592 bgcolor=#E9E9E9
| 547592 ||  || — || September 19, 2010 || Kitt Peak || Spacewatch ||  || align=right | 1.4 km || 
|-id=593 bgcolor=#E9E9E9
| 547593 ||  || — || September 17, 2010 || Kitt Peak || Spacewatch ||  || align=right | 1.3 km || 
|-id=594 bgcolor=#E9E9E9
| 547594 ||  || — || November 22, 2006 || Kitt Peak || Spacewatch ||  || align=right | 2.1 km || 
|-id=595 bgcolor=#E9E9E9
| 547595 ||  || — || October 10, 2010 || Mount Lemmon || Mount Lemmon Survey ||  || align=right | 2.0 km || 
|-id=596 bgcolor=#E9E9E9
| 547596 ||  || — || September 19, 2010 || Kitt Peak || Spacewatch ||  || align=right | 1.5 km || 
|-id=597 bgcolor=#E9E9E9
| 547597 ||  || — || November 11, 2001 || Apache Point || SDSS Collaboration ||  || align=right | 1.8 km || 
|-id=598 bgcolor=#fefefe
| 547598 ||  || — || September 17, 2010 || Flagstaff || L. H. Wasserman ||  || align=right data-sort-value="0.87" | 870 m || 
|-id=599 bgcolor=#E9E9E9
| 547599 Virághalmy ||  ||  || October 12, 2010 || Piszkesteto || K. Sárneczky, J. Kelemen ||  || align=right | 1.7 km || 
|-id=600 bgcolor=#FA8072
| 547600 ||  || — || September 18, 2010 || Mount Lemmon || Mount Lemmon Survey ||  || align=right data-sort-value="0.59" | 590 m || 
|}

547601–547700 

|-bgcolor=#E9E9E9
| 547601 ||  || — || September 18, 2010 || Mount Lemmon || Mount Lemmon Survey ||  || align=right | 1.8 km || 
|-id=602 bgcolor=#E9E9E9
| 547602 ||  || — || September 18, 2010 || Mount Lemmon || Mount Lemmon Survey ||  || align=right | 2.0 km || 
|-id=603 bgcolor=#FA8072
| 547603 ||  || — || November 5, 2007 || Kitt Peak || Spacewatch ||  || align=right data-sort-value="0.52" | 520 m || 
|-id=604 bgcolor=#fefefe
| 547604 ||  || — || April 12, 2005 || Kitt Peak || Kitt Peak Obs. ||  || align=right data-sort-value="0.65" | 650 m || 
|-id=605 bgcolor=#E9E9E9
| 547605 ||  || — || October 11, 2010 || Mount Lemmon || Mount Lemmon Survey ||  || align=right | 1.7 km || 
|-id=606 bgcolor=#E9E9E9
| 547606 ||  || — || October 14, 2010 || Bergisch Gladbach || W. Bickel ||  || align=right | 1.6 km || 
|-id=607 bgcolor=#E9E9E9
| 547607 ||  || — || October 14, 2010 || Mount Lemmon || Mount Lemmon Survey ||  || align=right | 1.4 km || 
|-id=608 bgcolor=#fefefe
| 547608 ||  || — || October 15, 2010 || Mayhill-ISON || L. Elenin ||  || align=right data-sort-value="0.82" | 820 m || 
|-id=609 bgcolor=#d6d6d6
| 547609 ||  || — || October 31, 2005 || Mount Lemmon || Mount Lemmon Survey ||  || align=right | 2.9 km || 
|-id=610 bgcolor=#E9E9E9
| 547610 ||  || — || October 20, 2001 || Palomar || NEAT ||  || align=right | 2.5 km || 
|-id=611 bgcolor=#E9E9E9
| 547611 ||  || — || November 11, 2006 || Kitt Peak || Spacewatch ||  || align=right | 2.2 km || 
|-id=612 bgcolor=#E9E9E9
| 547612 ||  || — || October 11, 2010 || Piszkesteto || G. Szabó ||  || align=right | 2.0 km || 
|-id=613 bgcolor=#E9E9E9
| 547613 ||  || — || October 13, 2010 || Mount Lemmon || Mount Lemmon Survey ||  || align=right | 1.7 km || 
|-id=614 bgcolor=#E9E9E9
| 547614 ||  || — || October 2, 2010 || Kitt Peak || Spacewatch ||  || align=right | 1.6 km || 
|-id=615 bgcolor=#E9E9E9
| 547615 ||  || — || October 12, 2010 || Mount Lemmon || Mount Lemmon Survey ||  || align=right | 2.3 km || 
|-id=616 bgcolor=#C2E0FF
| 547616 ||  || — || June 15, 2010 || Haleakala || Pan-STARRS || plutino || align=right | 126 km || 
|-id=617 bgcolor=#C2E0FF
| 547617 ||  || — || October 9, 2010 || Haleakala || Pan-STARRS || cubewano? || align=right | 278 km || 
|-id=618 bgcolor=#fefefe
| 547618 ||  || — || October 12, 2010 || Kitt Peak || Spacewatch ||  || align=right data-sort-value="0.68" | 680 m || 
|-id=619 bgcolor=#fefefe
| 547619 ||  || — || October 12, 2010 || Mount Lemmon || Mount Lemmon Survey ||  || align=right data-sort-value="0.66" | 660 m || 
|-id=620 bgcolor=#fefefe
| 547620 ||  || — || October 12, 2010 || Mount Lemmon || Mount Lemmon Survey ||  || align=right data-sort-value="0.65" | 650 m || 
|-id=621 bgcolor=#E9E9E9
| 547621 ||  || — || July 7, 2014 || Haleakala || Pan-STARRS ||  || align=right | 1.9 km || 
|-id=622 bgcolor=#E9E9E9
| 547622 ||  || — || October 10, 2010 || Kitt Peak || Spacewatch ||  || align=right | 1.8 km || 
|-id=623 bgcolor=#E9E9E9
| 547623 ||  || — || January 19, 2012 || Kitt Peak || Spacewatch ||  || align=right | 2.1 km || 
|-id=624 bgcolor=#fefefe
| 547624 ||  || — || October 3, 2010 || Catalina || CSS ||  || align=right data-sort-value="0.56" | 560 m || 
|-id=625 bgcolor=#E9E9E9
| 547625 ||  || — || October 1, 2010 || Mount Lemmon || Mount Lemmon Survey ||  || align=right | 1.8 km || 
|-id=626 bgcolor=#E9E9E9
| 547626 ||  || — || January 18, 2012 || Kitt Peak || Spacewatch ||  || align=right | 1.7 km || 
|-id=627 bgcolor=#E9E9E9
| 547627 ||  || — || November 10, 2015 || Mount Lemmon || Mount Lemmon Survey ||  || align=right | 2.4 km || 
|-id=628 bgcolor=#E9E9E9
| 547628 ||  || — || October 9, 2010 || Mount Lemmon || Mount Lemmon Survey ||  || align=right | 1.6 km || 
|-id=629 bgcolor=#E9E9E9
| 547629 ||  || — || January 30, 2012 || Kitt Peak || Spacewatch ||  || align=right | 1.6 km || 
|-id=630 bgcolor=#fefefe
| 547630 ||  || — || October 14, 2010 || Mount Lemmon || Mount Lemmon Survey ||  || align=right data-sort-value="0.57" | 570 m || 
|-id=631 bgcolor=#E9E9E9
| 547631 ||  || — || March 17, 2013 || Kitt Peak || Spacewatch ||  || align=right | 1.9 km || 
|-id=632 bgcolor=#d6d6d6
| 547632 ||  || — || October 13, 2010 || Mount Lemmon || Mount Lemmon Survey ||  || align=right | 2.1 km || 
|-id=633 bgcolor=#d6d6d6
| 547633 ||  || — || October 1, 2010 || Mount Lemmon || Mount Lemmon Survey ||  || align=right | 1.9 km || 
|-id=634 bgcolor=#E9E9E9
| 547634 ||  || — || October 12, 2010 || Mount Lemmon || Mount Lemmon Survey ||  || align=right | 1.4 km || 
|-id=635 bgcolor=#E9E9E9
| 547635 ||  || — || October 11, 2010 || Mount Lemmon || Mount Lemmon Survey ||  || align=right | 1.5 km || 
|-id=636 bgcolor=#fefefe
| 547636 ||  || — || May 16, 2013 || Haleakala || Pan-STARRS ||  || align=right data-sort-value="0.45" | 450 m || 
|-id=637 bgcolor=#d6d6d6
| 547637 ||  || — || October 13, 2010 || Mount Lemmon || Mount Lemmon Survey ||  || align=right | 2.3 km || 
|-id=638 bgcolor=#d6d6d6
| 547638 ||  || — || October 2, 2010 || Mount Lemmon || Mount Lemmon Survey ||  || align=right | 2.1 km || 
|-id=639 bgcolor=#d6d6d6
| 547639 ||  || — || October 3, 2010 || Kitt Peak || Spacewatch ||  || align=right | 2.5 km || 
|-id=640 bgcolor=#d6d6d6
| 547640 ||  || — || July 19, 2015 || Haleakala || Pan-STARRS ||  || align=right | 1.9 km || 
|-id=641 bgcolor=#fefefe
| 547641 ||  || — || October 12, 2010 || Mount Lemmon || Mount Lemmon Survey ||  || align=right data-sort-value="0.78" | 780 m || 
|-id=642 bgcolor=#d6d6d6
| 547642 ||  || — || October 13, 2010 || Mount Lemmon || Mount Lemmon Survey ||  || align=right | 2.2 km || 
|-id=643 bgcolor=#d6d6d6
| 547643 ||  || — || October 14, 2010 || Mount Lemmon || Mount Lemmon Survey ||  || align=right | 2.1 km || 
|-id=644 bgcolor=#E9E9E9
| 547644 ||  || — || October 17, 2010 || Mount Lemmon || Mount Lemmon Survey ||  || align=right | 1.9 km || 
|-id=645 bgcolor=#E9E9E9
| 547645 ||  || — || September 16, 2010 || Mount Lemmon || Mount Lemmon Survey ||  || align=right | 1.5 km || 
|-id=646 bgcolor=#E9E9E9
| 547646 ||  || — || October 28, 2010 || Catalina || CSS ||  || align=right | 2.2 km || 
|-id=647 bgcolor=#fefefe
| 547647 ||  || — || January 17, 2005 || Kitt Peak || Spacewatch ||  || align=right data-sort-value="0.66" | 660 m || 
|-id=648 bgcolor=#fefefe
| 547648 ||  || — || March 11, 1996 || Kitt Peak || Spacewatch ||  || align=right data-sort-value="0.77" | 770 m || 
|-id=649 bgcolor=#E9E9E9
| 547649 ||  || — || March 30, 2003 || Kitt Peak || M. W. Buie, A. B. Jordan || AGN || align=right | 1.2 km || 
|-id=650 bgcolor=#d6d6d6
| 547650 ||  || — || October 12, 2005 || Kitt Peak || Spacewatch ||  || align=right | 2.1 km || 
|-id=651 bgcolor=#d6d6d6
| 547651 ||  || — || February 6, 2007 || Mount Lemmon || Mount Lemmon Survey ||  || align=right | 1.8 km || 
|-id=652 bgcolor=#E9E9E9
| 547652 ||  || — || March 8, 2003 || Palomar || NEAT ||  || align=right | 1.9 km || 
|-id=653 bgcolor=#E9E9E9
| 547653 ||  || — || March 12, 2008 || Kitt Peak || Spacewatch ||  || align=right | 2.2 km || 
|-id=654 bgcolor=#E9E9E9
| 547654 ||  || — || October 28, 2010 || Mount Lemmon || Mount Lemmon Survey ||  || align=right | 1.6 km || 
|-id=655 bgcolor=#fefefe
| 547655 ||  || — || October 28, 2010 || Mount Lemmon || Mount Lemmon Survey ||  || align=right data-sort-value="0.59" | 590 m || 
|-id=656 bgcolor=#E9E9E9
| 547656 ||  || — || October 28, 2010 || Catalina || CSS ||  || align=right | 1.9 km || 
|-id=657 bgcolor=#E9E9E9
| 547657 ||  || — || October 12, 2010 || Mount Lemmon || Mount Lemmon Survey ||  || align=right | 2.1 km || 
|-id=658 bgcolor=#E9E9E9
| 547658 ||  || — || October 17, 2010 || Mount Lemmon || Mount Lemmon Survey ||  || align=right | 1.7 km || 
|-id=659 bgcolor=#E9E9E9
| 547659 ||  || — || October 28, 2010 || Mount Lemmon || Mount Lemmon Survey ||  || align=right | 1.8 km || 
|-id=660 bgcolor=#E9E9E9
| 547660 ||  || — || March 27, 2008 || Mount Lemmon || Mount Lemmon Survey ||  || align=right | 1.9 km || 
|-id=661 bgcolor=#E9E9E9
| 547661 ||  || — || October 14, 2010 || Mount Lemmon || Mount Lemmon Survey ||  || align=right | 2.1 km || 
|-id=662 bgcolor=#E9E9E9
| 547662 ||  || — || October 28, 2010 || Mount Lemmon || Mount Lemmon Survey ||  || align=right | 2.0 km || 
|-id=663 bgcolor=#d6d6d6
| 547663 ||  || — || March 6, 2008 || Mount Lemmon || Mount Lemmon Survey ||  || align=right | 3.0 km || 
|-id=664 bgcolor=#E9E9E9
| 547664 ||  || — || October 28, 2010 || Piszkesteto || Z. Kuli, K. Sárneczky ||  || align=right | 2.7 km || 
|-id=665 bgcolor=#E9E9E9
| 547665 ||  || — || November 16, 2001 || Kitt Peak || Spacewatch ||  || align=right | 1.6 km || 
|-id=666 bgcolor=#fefefe
| 547666 Morgon ||  ||  || March 3, 2005 || Nogales || J.-C. Merlin ||  || align=right data-sort-value="0.75" | 750 m || 
|-id=667 bgcolor=#E9E9E9
| 547667 ||  || — || October 9, 2010 || Catalina || CSS ||  || align=right | 1.8 km || 
|-id=668 bgcolor=#E9E9E9
| 547668 ||  || — || October 29, 2010 || Mount Lemmon || Mount Lemmon Survey ||  || align=right | 2.2 km || 
|-id=669 bgcolor=#E9E9E9
| 547669 ||  || — || July 30, 2005 || Palomar || NEAT ||  || align=right | 2.3 km || 
|-id=670 bgcolor=#E9E9E9
| 547670 ||  || — || October 29, 2010 || Mount Lemmon || Mount Lemmon Survey ||  || align=right | 2.1 km || 
|-id=671 bgcolor=#E9E9E9
| 547671 ||  || — || September 17, 2010 || Mount Lemmon || Mount Lemmon Survey ||  || align=right | 1.7 km || 
|-id=672 bgcolor=#E9E9E9
| 547672 ||  || — || August 5, 2005 || Palomar || NEAT ||  || align=right | 2.0 km || 
|-id=673 bgcolor=#fefefe
| 547673 ||  || — || October 13, 2010 || Catalina || CSS ||  || align=right data-sort-value="0.71" | 710 m || 
|-id=674 bgcolor=#E9E9E9
| 547674 ||  || — || September 16, 2010 || Mount Lemmon || Mount Lemmon Survey ||  || align=right | 1.8 km || 
|-id=675 bgcolor=#E9E9E9
| 547675 ||  || — || April 1, 2008 || Kitt Peak || Spacewatch ||  || align=right | 2.3 km || 
|-id=676 bgcolor=#E9E9E9
| 547676 ||  || — || October 14, 2010 || Mount Lemmon || Mount Lemmon Survey ||  || align=right | 2.1 km || 
|-id=677 bgcolor=#E9E9E9
| 547677 ||  || — || October 13, 2010 || Mount Lemmon || Mount Lemmon Survey ||  || align=right | 2.3 km || 
|-id=678 bgcolor=#d6d6d6
| 547678 ||  || — || October 31, 2010 || Mount Lemmon || Mount Lemmon Survey || 3:2 || align=right | 4.6 km || 
|-id=679 bgcolor=#fefefe
| 547679 ||  || — || September 11, 2010 || Mount Lemmon || Mount Lemmon Survey ||  || align=right data-sort-value="0.59" | 590 m || 
|-id=680 bgcolor=#E9E9E9
| 547680 ||  || — || October 13, 2010 || Mount Lemmon || Mount Lemmon Survey ||  || align=right | 2.3 km || 
|-id=681 bgcolor=#d6d6d6
| 547681 ||  || — || October 24, 2005 || Kitt Peak || Spacewatch ||  || align=right | 2.3 km || 
|-id=682 bgcolor=#fefefe
| 547682 ||  || — || October 16, 2010 || ESA OGS || ESA OGS ||  || align=right data-sort-value="0.57" | 570 m || 
|-id=683 bgcolor=#E9E9E9
| 547683 ||  || — || September 23, 2005 || Kitt Peak || Spacewatch ||  || align=right | 1.9 km || 
|-id=684 bgcolor=#E9E9E9
| 547684 ||  || — || October 11, 2010 || Catalina || CSS ||  || align=right | 2.0 km || 
|-id=685 bgcolor=#E9E9E9
| 547685 ||  || — || September 23, 2005 || Kitt Peak || Spacewatch ||  || align=right | 3.3 km || 
|-id=686 bgcolor=#E9E9E9
| 547686 ||  || — || October 17, 2010 || Mount Lemmon || Mount Lemmon Survey ||  || align=right | 1.8 km || 
|-id=687 bgcolor=#fefefe
| 547687 ||  || — || October 12, 2010 || Mount Lemmon || Mount Lemmon Survey ||  || align=right data-sort-value="0.82" | 820 m || 
|-id=688 bgcolor=#fefefe
| 547688 ||  || — || August 10, 2010 || Kitt Peak || Spacewatch ||  || align=right data-sort-value="0.94" | 940 m || 
|-id=689 bgcolor=#E9E9E9
| 547689 ||  || — || October 13, 2010 || Mount Lemmon || Mount Lemmon Survey ||  || align=right | 1.7 km || 
|-id=690 bgcolor=#fefefe
| 547690 ||  || — || October 19, 2010 || Mount Lemmon || Mount Lemmon Survey ||  || align=right data-sort-value="0.59" | 590 m || 
|-id=691 bgcolor=#E9E9E9
| 547691 ||  || — || October 19, 2006 || Kitt Peak || Spacewatch ||  || align=right | 1.7 km || 
|-id=692 bgcolor=#fefefe
| 547692 ||  || — || October 31, 2010 || Mount Lemmon || Mount Lemmon Survey ||  || align=right data-sort-value="0.59" | 590 m || 
|-id=693 bgcolor=#E9E9E9
| 547693 ||  || — || November 2, 2010 || Mount Lemmon || Mount Lemmon Survey ||  || align=right | 1.5 km || 
|-id=694 bgcolor=#E9E9E9
| 547694 ||  || — || October 17, 2010 || Mount Lemmon || Mount Lemmon Survey ||  || align=right | 1.4 km || 
|-id=695 bgcolor=#fefefe
| 547695 ||  || — || October 28, 2010 || Mount Lemmon || Mount Lemmon Survey ||  || align=right data-sort-value="0.64" | 640 m || 
|-id=696 bgcolor=#E9E9E9
| 547696 ||  || — || October 29, 2010 || Mount Lemmon || Mount Lemmon Survey ||  || align=right | 1.8 km || 
|-id=697 bgcolor=#E9E9E9
| 547697 ||  || — || October 28, 2010 || Catalina || CSS ||  || align=right | 1.6 km || 
|-id=698 bgcolor=#E9E9E9
| 547698 ||  || — || December 7, 2015 || Haleakala || Pan-STARRS ||  || align=right | 2.0 km || 
|-id=699 bgcolor=#fefefe
| 547699 ||  || — || November 2, 2010 || Mount Lemmon || Mount Lemmon Survey ||  || align=right data-sort-value="0.65" | 650 m || 
|-id=700 bgcolor=#E9E9E9
| 547700 ||  || — || October 31, 2010 || Mount Lemmon || Mount Lemmon Survey ||  || align=right | 1.8 km || 
|}

547701–547800 

|-bgcolor=#d6d6d6
| 547701 ||  || — || October 28, 2010 || Mount Lemmon || Mount Lemmon Survey ||  || align=right | 2.2 km || 
|-id=702 bgcolor=#fefefe
| 547702 ||  || — || October 31, 2010 || Mount Lemmon || Mount Lemmon Survey ||  || align=right data-sort-value="0.49" | 490 m || 
|-id=703 bgcolor=#E9E9E9
| 547703 ||  || — || May 12, 2013 || Haleakala || Pan-STARRS ||  || align=right | 1.7 km || 
|-id=704 bgcolor=#E9E9E9
| 547704 ||  || — || October 30, 2010 || Kitt Peak || Spacewatch ||  || align=right | 2.1 km || 
|-id=705 bgcolor=#E9E9E9
| 547705 ||  || — || October 31, 2010 || Piszkesteto || Z. Kuli ||  || align=right | 1.7 km || 
|-id=706 bgcolor=#d6d6d6
| 547706 ||  || — || October 31, 2010 || Mount Lemmon || Mount Lemmon Survey ||  || align=right | 2.8 km || 
|-id=707 bgcolor=#E9E9E9
| 547707 ||  || — || October 17, 2010 || Mount Lemmon || Mount Lemmon Survey ||  || align=right | 1.7 km || 
|-id=708 bgcolor=#fefefe
| 547708 ||  || — || November 1, 2010 || Mount Lemmon || Mount Lemmon Survey ||  || align=right data-sort-value="0.65" | 650 m || 
|-id=709 bgcolor=#E9E9E9
| 547709 ||  || — || April 5, 2008 || Mount Lemmon || Mount Lemmon Survey ||  || align=right | 1.8 km || 
|-id=710 bgcolor=#E9E9E9
| 547710 ||  || — || November 1, 2010 || Mount Lemmon || Mount Lemmon Survey ||  || align=right | 2.1 km || 
|-id=711 bgcolor=#E9E9E9
| 547711 ||  || — || October 12, 2010 || Mount Lemmon || Mount Lemmon Survey ||  || align=right | 1.2 km || 
|-id=712 bgcolor=#E9E9E9
| 547712 ||  || — || September 11, 2010 || Mount Lemmon || Mount Lemmon Survey ||  || align=right | 1.7 km || 
|-id=713 bgcolor=#d6d6d6
| 547713 ||  || — || November 16, 1995 || Kitt Peak || Spacewatch ||  || align=right | 2.2 km || 
|-id=714 bgcolor=#fefefe
| 547714 ||  || — || November 8, 1991 || Kitt Peak || Spacewatch ||  || align=right data-sort-value="0.61" | 610 m || 
|-id=715 bgcolor=#fefefe
| 547715 ||  || — || October 14, 2010 || Mount Lemmon || Mount Lemmon Survey ||  || align=right data-sort-value="0.52" | 520 m || 
|-id=716 bgcolor=#E9E9E9
| 547716 ||  || — || October 29, 2010 || Mount Lemmon || Mount Lemmon Survey ||  || align=right | 2.8 km || 
|-id=717 bgcolor=#E9E9E9
| 547717 ||  || — || November 4, 2010 || Mount Lemmon || Mount Lemmon Survey ||  || align=right | 1.9 km || 
|-id=718 bgcolor=#E9E9E9
| 547718 ||  || — || November 4, 2010 || La Sagra || OAM Obs. ||  || align=right | 2.7 km || 
|-id=719 bgcolor=#E9E9E9
| 547719 ||  || — || May 28, 2000 || Socorro || LINEAR ||  || align=right | 2.4 km || 
|-id=720 bgcolor=#E9E9E9
| 547720 ||  || — || February 14, 2004 || Palomar || NEAT ||  || align=right | 3.2 km || 
|-id=721 bgcolor=#E9E9E9
| 547721 ||  || — || October 11, 2010 || Mount Lemmon || Mount Lemmon Survey ||  || align=right | 1.7 km || 
|-id=722 bgcolor=#E9E9E9
| 547722 ||  || — || October 17, 2010 || Mount Lemmon || Mount Lemmon Survey ||  || align=right | 1.3 km || 
|-id=723 bgcolor=#E9E9E9
| 547723 ||  || — || October 25, 2001 || Kitt Peak || Spacewatch ||  || align=right | 1.8 km || 
|-id=724 bgcolor=#E9E9E9
| 547724 ||  || — || September 3, 2005 || Mauna Kea || Mauna Kea Obs. ||  || align=right | 1.9 km || 
|-id=725 bgcolor=#fefefe
| 547725 ||  || — || October 19, 2010 || Mount Lemmon || Mount Lemmon Survey ||  || align=right data-sort-value="0.59" | 590 m || 
|-id=726 bgcolor=#E9E9E9
| 547726 ||  || — || November 3, 2010 || Kitt Peak || Spacewatch ||  || align=right | 2.0 km || 
|-id=727 bgcolor=#fefefe
| 547727 ||  || — || November 3, 2010 || Mount Lemmon || Mount Lemmon Survey ||  || align=right data-sort-value="0.54" | 540 m || 
|-id=728 bgcolor=#E9E9E9
| 547728 ||  || — || October 9, 2010 || Kitt Peak || Spacewatch ||  || align=right | 1.7 km || 
|-id=729 bgcolor=#E9E9E9
| 547729 ||  || — || November 3, 2010 || Mount Lemmon || Mount Lemmon Survey ||  || align=right | 1.6 km || 
|-id=730 bgcolor=#E9E9E9
| 547730 ||  || — || November 3, 2010 || Mount Lemmon || Mount Lemmon Survey ||  || align=right | 1.5 km || 
|-id=731 bgcolor=#E9E9E9
| 547731 ||  || — || October 17, 2010 || Mount Lemmon || Mount Lemmon Survey ||  || align=right | 1.8 km || 
|-id=732 bgcolor=#E9E9E9
| 547732 ||  || — || December 15, 2006 || Mount Lemmon || Mount Lemmon Survey ||  || align=right | 2.0 km || 
|-id=733 bgcolor=#d6d6d6
| 547733 ||  || — || November 4, 2010 || Mount Lemmon || Mount Lemmon Survey ||  || align=right | 2.8 km || 
|-id=734 bgcolor=#d6d6d6
| 547734 ||  || — || November 5, 2010 || Kitt Peak || Spacewatch ||  || align=right | 2.4 km || 
|-id=735 bgcolor=#E9E9E9
| 547735 ||  || — || September 30, 2010 || Mount Lemmon || Mount Lemmon Survey ||  || align=right | 1.6 km || 
|-id=736 bgcolor=#E9E9E9
| 547736 ||  || — || January 17, 2007 || Kitt Peak || Spacewatch ||  || align=right | 2.3 km || 
|-id=737 bgcolor=#d6d6d6
| 547737 ||  || — || September 27, 2005 || Kitt Peak || Spacewatch ||  || align=right | 2.7 km || 
|-id=738 bgcolor=#E9E9E9
| 547738 ||  || — || August 25, 2005 || Palomar || NEAT ||  || align=right | 2.6 km || 
|-id=739 bgcolor=#d6d6d6
| 547739 ||  || — || June 14, 2004 || Kitt Peak || Spacewatch ||  || align=right | 3.0 km || 
|-id=740 bgcolor=#E9E9E9
| 547740 ||  || — || September 11, 2010 || Mount Lemmon || Mount Lemmon Survey ||  || align=right | 1.9 km || 
|-id=741 bgcolor=#E9E9E9
| 547741 ||  || — || November 3, 2010 || Mount Lemmon || Mount Lemmon Survey ||  || align=right | 2.4 km || 
|-id=742 bgcolor=#E9E9E9
| 547742 ||  || — || October 29, 2005 || Mount Lemmon || Mount Lemmon Survey ||  || align=right | 2.1 km || 
|-id=743 bgcolor=#E9E9E9
| 547743 ||  || — || November 6, 2010 || Kitt Peak || Spacewatch ||  || align=right | 1.8 km || 
|-id=744 bgcolor=#E9E9E9
| 547744 ||  || — || November 6, 2010 || Kitt Peak || Spacewatch ||  || align=right | 2.4 km || 
|-id=745 bgcolor=#E9E9E9
| 547745 ||  || — || September 18, 2010 || Mount Lemmon || Mount Lemmon Survey ||  || align=right | 1.6 km || 
|-id=746 bgcolor=#E9E9E9
| 547746 ||  || — || November 7, 2010 || Mount Lemmon || Mount Lemmon Survey ||  || align=right | 1.8 km || 
|-id=747 bgcolor=#fefefe
| 547747 ||  || — || December 5, 2002 || Haleakala || AMOS || H || align=right data-sort-value="0.92" | 920 m || 
|-id=748 bgcolor=#d6d6d6
| 547748 ||  || — || November 5, 2010 || Kitt Peak || Spacewatch ||  || align=right | 2.4 km || 
|-id=749 bgcolor=#fefefe
| 547749 ||  || — || November 5, 2010 || Mount Lemmon || Mount Lemmon Survey ||  || align=right data-sort-value="0.82" | 820 m || 
|-id=750 bgcolor=#fefefe
| 547750 ||  || — || April 27, 2009 || Mount Lemmon || Mount Lemmon Survey ||  || align=right data-sort-value="0.62" | 620 m || 
|-id=751 bgcolor=#E9E9E9
| 547751 ||  || — || November 6, 2010 || Catalina || CSS ||  || align=right | 2.7 km || 
|-id=752 bgcolor=#d6d6d6
| 547752 ||  || — || November 6, 2010 || Mount Lemmon || Mount Lemmon Survey ||  || align=right | 1.9 km || 
|-id=753 bgcolor=#d6d6d6
| 547753 ||  || — || November 4, 2005 || Mount Lemmon || Mount Lemmon Survey ||  || align=right | 1.8 km || 
|-id=754 bgcolor=#FA8072
| 547754 ||  || — || November 7, 2010 || Mount Lemmon || Mount Lemmon Survey ||  || align=right data-sort-value="0.64" | 640 m || 
|-id=755 bgcolor=#E9E9E9
| 547755 ||  || — || November 8, 2010 || Kitt Peak || Spacewatch ||  || align=right | 1.9 km || 
|-id=756 bgcolor=#fefefe
| 547756 ||  || — || December 18, 2007 || Mount Lemmon || Mount Lemmon Survey ||  || align=right data-sort-value="0.75" | 750 m || 
|-id=757 bgcolor=#E9E9E9
| 547757 ||  || — || October 29, 2010 || Mount Lemmon || Mount Lemmon Survey ||  || align=right | 2.5 km || 
|-id=758 bgcolor=#E9E9E9
| 547758 ||  || — || October 29, 2010 || Mount Lemmon || Mount Lemmon Survey ||  || align=right | 1.8 km || 
|-id=759 bgcolor=#E9E9E9
| 547759 ||  || — || November 2, 2010 || Mount Lemmon || Mount Lemmon Survey ||  || align=right | 2.7 km || 
|-id=760 bgcolor=#E9E9E9
| 547760 ||  || — || November 10, 2010 || Kitt Peak || Spacewatch ||  || align=right | 1.9 km || 
|-id=761 bgcolor=#E9E9E9
| 547761 ||  || — || October 28, 2010 || Mount Lemmon || Mount Lemmon Survey ||  || align=right | 1.9 km || 
|-id=762 bgcolor=#E9E9E9
| 547762 ||  || — || January 9, 2007 || Mount Lemmon || Mount Lemmon Survey ||  || align=right | 1.5 km || 
|-id=763 bgcolor=#d6d6d6
| 547763 ||  || — || October 17, 2010 || Mount Lemmon || Mount Lemmon Survey ||  || align=right | 2.2 km || 
|-id=764 bgcolor=#d6d6d6
| 547764 ||  || — || October 13, 2010 || Mount Lemmon || Mount Lemmon Survey || BRA || align=right | 1.2 km || 
|-id=765 bgcolor=#d6d6d6
| 547765 ||  || — || November 8, 2010 || Mount Lemmon || Mount Lemmon Survey ||  || align=right | 1.8 km || 
|-id=766 bgcolor=#fefefe
| 547766 ||  || — || January 13, 2008 || Kitt Peak || Spacewatch ||  || align=right data-sort-value="0.65" | 650 m || 
|-id=767 bgcolor=#d6d6d6
| 547767 ||  || — || December 2, 2005 || Kitt Peak || Spacewatch ||  || align=right | 1.8 km || 
|-id=768 bgcolor=#fefefe
| 547768 ||  || — || November 10, 2010 || Mount Lemmon || Mount Lemmon Survey ||  || align=right data-sort-value="0.52" | 520 m || 
|-id=769 bgcolor=#E9E9E9
| 547769 ||  || — || February 23, 2007 || Catalina || CSS ||  || align=right | 2.2 km || 
|-id=770 bgcolor=#E9E9E9
| 547770 ||  || — || October 12, 2005 || Kitt Peak || Spacewatch ||  || align=right | 1.8 km || 
|-id=771 bgcolor=#E9E9E9
| 547771 ||  || — || October 11, 2005 || Kitt Peak || Spacewatch ||  || align=right | 2.4 km || 
|-id=772 bgcolor=#E9E9E9
| 547772 ||  || — || February 10, 2008 || Kitt Peak || Spacewatch ||  || align=right | 1.7 km || 
|-id=773 bgcolor=#E9E9E9
| 547773 ||  || — || November 11, 2010 || Mount Lemmon || Mount Lemmon Survey ||  || align=right | 1.7 km || 
|-id=774 bgcolor=#E9E9E9
| 547774 ||  || — || November 11, 2010 || Mount Lemmon || Mount Lemmon Survey ||  || align=right | 2.4 km || 
|-id=775 bgcolor=#E9E9E9
| 547775 ||  || — || November 11, 2010 || Mount Lemmon || Mount Lemmon Survey ||  || align=right | 2.3 km || 
|-id=776 bgcolor=#fefefe
| 547776 ||  || — || November 11, 2010 || Mount Lemmon || Mount Lemmon Survey ||  || align=right data-sort-value="0.52" | 520 m || 
|-id=777 bgcolor=#E9E9E9
| 547777 ||  || — || November 11, 2010 || Mount Lemmon || Mount Lemmon Survey ||  || align=right | 2.0 km || 
|-id=778 bgcolor=#E9E9E9
| 547778 ||  || — || September 29, 2005 || Kitt Peak || Spacewatch ||  || align=right | 1.9 km || 
|-id=779 bgcolor=#E9E9E9
| 547779 ||  || — || December 21, 2006 || Kitt Peak || L. H. Wasserman || AST || align=right | 1.7 km || 
|-id=780 bgcolor=#E9E9E9
| 547780 ||  || — || April 7, 2008 || Mount Lemmon || Mount Lemmon Survey ||  || align=right | 2.4 km || 
|-id=781 bgcolor=#E9E9E9
| 547781 ||  || — || November 13, 2010 || Mount Lemmon || Mount Lemmon Survey ||  || align=right | 1.8 km || 
|-id=782 bgcolor=#E9E9E9
| 547782 ||  || — || February 1, 2008 || Mount Lemmon || Mount Lemmon Survey ||  || align=right | 2.5 km || 
|-id=783 bgcolor=#E9E9E9
| 547783 ||  || — || November 13, 2010 || Mount Lemmon || Mount Lemmon Survey ||  || align=right | 1.7 km || 
|-id=784 bgcolor=#fefefe
| 547784 ||  || — || March 23, 1995 || Kitt Peak || Spacewatch ||  || align=right data-sort-value="0.59" | 590 m || 
|-id=785 bgcolor=#E9E9E9
| 547785 ||  || — || November 6, 2010 || Kitt Peak || Spacewatch ||  || align=right | 1.9 km || 
|-id=786 bgcolor=#E9E9E9
| 547786 ||  || — || April 3, 2008 || Mount Lemmon || Mount Lemmon Survey ||  || align=right | 2.5 km || 
|-id=787 bgcolor=#d6d6d6
| 547787 ||  || — || September 29, 2000 || Kitt Peak || Spacewatch ||  || align=right | 2.5 km || 
|-id=788 bgcolor=#E9E9E9
| 547788 ||  || — || November 2, 2010 || Mount Lemmon || Mount Lemmon Survey ||  || align=right | 2.2 km || 
|-id=789 bgcolor=#E9E9E9
| 547789 ||  || — || November 12, 2010 || Mount Lemmon || Mount Lemmon Survey ||  || align=right | 1.5 km || 
|-id=790 bgcolor=#d6d6d6
| 547790 ||  || — || November 11, 2010 || Mount Lemmon || Mount Lemmon Survey ||  || align=right | 2.7 km || 
|-id=791 bgcolor=#fefefe
| 547791 ||  || — || October 14, 2010 || Mount Lemmon || Mount Lemmon Survey ||  || align=right data-sort-value="0.78" | 780 m || 
|-id=792 bgcolor=#E9E9E9
| 547792 ||  || — || October 29, 2010 || Kitt Peak || Spacewatch ||  || align=right | 1.9 km || 
|-id=793 bgcolor=#E9E9E9
| 547793 ||  || — || June 15, 2009 || Kitt Peak || Spacewatch ||  || align=right | 2.2 km || 
|-id=794 bgcolor=#E9E9E9
| 547794 ||  || — || November 1, 2010 || Kitt Peak || Spacewatch ||  || align=right | 2.9 km || 
|-id=795 bgcolor=#d6d6d6
| 547795 ||  || — || March 9, 2008 || Kitt Peak || Spacewatch ||  || align=right | 3.1 km || 
|-id=796 bgcolor=#E9E9E9
| 547796 ||  || — || August 30, 2005 || Palomar || NEAT ||  || align=right | 2.5 km || 
|-id=797 bgcolor=#d6d6d6
| 547797 ||  || — || September 25, 2005 || Palomar || NEAT ||  || align=right | 2.5 km || 
|-id=798 bgcolor=#E9E9E9
| 547798 ||  || — || July 5, 2005 || Mount Lemmon || Mount Lemmon Survey || MRX || align=right | 1.1 km || 
|-id=799 bgcolor=#E9E9E9
| 547799 ||  || — || August 30, 2005 || Palomar || NEAT ||  || align=right | 2.2 km || 
|-id=800 bgcolor=#E9E9E9
| 547800 ||  || — || September 16, 2010 || Mount Lemmon || Mount Lemmon Survey ||  || align=right | 2.5 km || 
|}

547801–547900 

|-bgcolor=#E9E9E9
| 547801 ||  || — || March 13, 2012 || Mount Lemmon || Mount Lemmon Survey ||  || align=right | 1.6 km || 
|-id=802 bgcolor=#E9E9E9
| 547802 ||  || — || June 21, 2005 || Palomar || NEAT ||  || align=right | 2.4 km || 
|-id=803 bgcolor=#E9E9E9
| 547803 ||  || — || October 31, 2006 || Mount Lemmon || Mount Lemmon Survey ||  || align=right | 2.0 km || 
|-id=804 bgcolor=#fefefe
| 547804 ||  || — || October 14, 2010 || Mount Lemmon || Mount Lemmon Survey ||  || align=right data-sort-value="0.86" | 860 m || 
|-id=805 bgcolor=#E9E9E9
| 547805 ||  || — || January 18, 2012 || Kitt Peak || Spacewatch ||  || align=right | 1.9 km || 
|-id=806 bgcolor=#d6d6d6
| 547806 ||  || — || November 3, 2010 || Mount Lemmon || Mount Lemmon Survey ||  || align=right | 2.9 km || 
|-id=807 bgcolor=#E9E9E9
| 547807 ||  || — || October 12, 2010 || Mount Lemmon || Mount Lemmon Survey || WIT || align=right data-sort-value="0.85" | 850 m || 
|-id=808 bgcolor=#E9E9E9
| 547808 ||  || — || August 28, 2005 || Kitt Peak || Spacewatch ||  || align=right | 1.6 km || 
|-id=809 bgcolor=#E9E9E9
| 547809 ||  || — || January 19, 2012 || Haleakala || Pan-STARRS || AGN || align=right | 1.1 km || 
|-id=810 bgcolor=#E9E9E9
| 547810 ||  || — || November 12, 2010 || Mount Lemmon || Mount Lemmon Survey || JUN || align=right | 1.1 km || 
|-id=811 bgcolor=#d6d6d6
| 547811 ||  || — || September 16, 2010 || Mount Lemmon || Mount Lemmon Survey ||  || align=right | 2.3 km || 
|-id=812 bgcolor=#d6d6d6
| 547812 ||  || — || November 3, 2010 || Kitt Peak || Spacewatch ||  || align=right | 2.1 km || 
|-id=813 bgcolor=#E9E9E9
| 547813 ||  || — || September 2, 2005 || Palomar || NEAT ||  || align=right | 2.9 km || 
|-id=814 bgcolor=#d6d6d6
| 547814 ||  || — || October 1, 1995 || Kitt Peak || Spacewatch ||  || align=right | 1.9 km || 
|-id=815 bgcolor=#E9E9E9
| 547815 ||  || — || November 2, 2010 || Mount Lemmon || Mount Lemmon Survey ||  || align=right | 1.7 km || 
|-id=816 bgcolor=#E9E9E9
| 547816 ||  || — || September 26, 2005 || Kitt Peak || Spacewatch ||  || align=right | 1.8 km || 
|-id=817 bgcolor=#d6d6d6
| 547817 ||  || — || November 14, 2010 || Mount Lemmon || Mount Lemmon Survey ||  || align=right | 1.8 km || 
|-id=818 bgcolor=#E9E9E9
| 547818 ||  || — || November 11, 2010 || Mount Lemmon || Mount Lemmon Survey ||  || align=right | 2.2 km || 
|-id=819 bgcolor=#E9E9E9
| 547819 ||  || — || August 28, 2014 || Haleakala || Pan-STARRS ||  || align=right | 2.7 km || 
|-id=820 bgcolor=#E9E9E9
| 547820 ||  || — || February 13, 2012 || Zelenchukskaya Stn || T. V. Kryachko, B. Satovski ||  || align=right | 2.3 km || 
|-id=821 bgcolor=#E9E9E9
| 547821 ||  || — || January 30, 2012 || Mount Lemmon || Mount Lemmon Survey ||  || align=right | 1.9 km || 
|-id=822 bgcolor=#E9E9E9
| 547822 ||  || — || March 20, 2012 || Haleakala || Pan-STARRS ||  || align=right | 1.9 km || 
|-id=823 bgcolor=#fefefe
| 547823 ||  || — || October 5, 2013 || Haleakala || Pan-STARRS ||  || align=right data-sort-value="0.62" | 620 m || 
|-id=824 bgcolor=#d6d6d6
| 547824 ||  || — || April 7, 2014 || Mount Lemmon || Mount Lemmon Survey || 3:2 || align=right | 5.1 km || 
|-id=825 bgcolor=#E9E9E9
| 547825 ||  || — || November 2, 2010 || Mount Lemmon || Mount Lemmon Survey ||  || align=right | 2.6 km || 
|-id=826 bgcolor=#E9E9E9
| 547826 ||  || — || November 2, 2010 || Mount Lemmon || Mount Lemmon Survey ||  || align=right | 1.7 km || 
|-id=827 bgcolor=#d6d6d6
| 547827 ||  || — || October 19, 2015 || Haleakala || Pan-STARRS ||  || align=right | 1.9 km || 
|-id=828 bgcolor=#E9E9E9
| 547828 ||  || — || November 3, 2010 || Mount Lemmon || Mount Lemmon Survey ||  || align=right | 1.7 km || 
|-id=829 bgcolor=#E9E9E9
| 547829 ||  || — || November 8, 2010 || Mount Lemmon || Mount Lemmon Survey ||  || align=right | 1.7 km || 
|-id=830 bgcolor=#E9E9E9
| 547830 ||  || — || November 2, 2010 || Mount Lemmon || Mount Lemmon Survey ||  || align=right | 2.0 km || 
|-id=831 bgcolor=#E9E9E9
| 547831 ||  || — || November 9, 2010 || Mount Lemmon || Mount Lemmon Survey ||  || align=right | 1.6 km || 
|-id=832 bgcolor=#E9E9E9
| 547832 ||  || — || November 3, 2010 || Mount Lemmon || Mount Lemmon Survey ||  || align=right | 1.8 km || 
|-id=833 bgcolor=#E9E9E9
| 547833 ||  || — || December 9, 2015 || Haleakala || Pan-STARRS ||  || align=right | 1.7 km || 
|-id=834 bgcolor=#E9E9E9
| 547834 ||  || — || September 17, 2010 || Mount Lemmon || Mount Lemmon Survey ||  || align=right | 1.8 km || 
|-id=835 bgcolor=#d6d6d6
| 547835 ||  || — || November 8, 2010 || Mount Lemmon || Mount Lemmon Survey || 3:2 || align=right | 4.5 km || 
|-id=836 bgcolor=#E9E9E9
| 547836 ||  || — || November 11, 2010 || Kitt Peak || Spacewatch ||  || align=right | 1.5 km || 
|-id=837 bgcolor=#d6d6d6
| 547837 ||  || — || November 15, 2010 || Mount Lemmon || Mount Lemmon Survey ||  || align=right | 2.9 km || 
|-id=838 bgcolor=#E9E9E9
| 547838 ||  || — || November 12, 2010 || Mount Lemmon || Mount Lemmon Survey ||  || align=right | 1.8 km || 
|-id=839 bgcolor=#E9E9E9
| 547839 ||  || — || November 6, 2010 || Mount Lemmon || Mount Lemmon Survey ||  || align=right | 1.7 km || 
|-id=840 bgcolor=#E9E9E9
| 547840 ||  || — || November 11, 2010 || Mount Lemmon || Mount Lemmon Survey ||  || align=right | 2.2 km || 
|-id=841 bgcolor=#fefefe
| 547841 ||  || — || September 30, 2010 || Mount Lemmon || Mount Lemmon Survey ||  || align=right data-sort-value="0.58" | 580 m || 
|-id=842 bgcolor=#d6d6d6
| 547842 ||  || — || November 13, 2010 || Kitt Peak || Spacewatch ||  || align=right | 2.4 km || 
|-id=843 bgcolor=#d6d6d6
| 547843 ||  || — || November 14, 2010 || Mount Lemmon || Mount Lemmon Survey ||  || align=right | 2.8 km || 
|-id=844 bgcolor=#d6d6d6
| 547844 ||  || — || November 6, 2010 || Kitt Peak || Spacewatch ||  || align=right | 2.8 km || 
|-id=845 bgcolor=#C2FFFF
| 547845 ||  || — || November 8, 2010 || Kitt Peak || Spacewatch || L4 || align=right | 7.2 km || 
|-id=846 bgcolor=#fefefe
| 547846 ||  || — || September 19, 2003 || Kitt Peak || Spacewatch ||  || align=right data-sort-value="0.57" | 570 m || 
|-id=847 bgcolor=#d6d6d6
| 547847 ||  || — || November 5, 2010 || Kitt Peak || Spacewatch ||  || align=right | 2.9 km || 
|-id=848 bgcolor=#E9E9E9
| 547848 ||  || — || November 12, 2010 || Kitt Peak || Spacewatch ||  || align=right | 1.7 km || 
|-id=849 bgcolor=#E9E9E9
| 547849 ||  || — || November 27, 2010 || Mount Lemmon || Mount Lemmon Survey ||  || align=right | 1.8 km || 
|-id=850 bgcolor=#E9E9E9
| 547850 ||  || — || November 1, 2010 || Mount Lemmon || Mount Lemmon Survey ||  || align=right | 1.9 km || 
|-id=851 bgcolor=#fefefe
| 547851 ||  || — || November 10, 2010 || Mount Lemmon || Mount Lemmon Survey ||  || align=right data-sort-value="0.62" | 620 m || 
|-id=852 bgcolor=#E9E9E9
| 547852 ||  || — || October 5, 2005 || Catalina || CSS ||  || align=right | 2.2 km || 
|-id=853 bgcolor=#E9E9E9
| 547853 ||  || — || August 10, 2005 || Siding Spring || SSS ||  || align=right | 1.9 km || 
|-id=854 bgcolor=#E9E9E9
| 547854 ||  || — || December 21, 2006 || Mount Lemmon || Mount Lemmon Survey ||  || align=right | 2.2 km || 
|-id=855 bgcolor=#E9E9E9
| 547855 ||  || — || September 18, 2010 || Mount Lemmon || Mount Lemmon Survey ||  || align=right | 2.7 km || 
|-id=856 bgcolor=#E9E9E9
| 547856 ||  || — || January 19, 2012 || Haleakala || Pan-STARRS ||  || align=right | 1.7 km || 
|-id=857 bgcolor=#E9E9E9
| 547857 ||  || — || March 26, 2003 || Palomar || NEAT ||  || align=right | 2.3 km || 
|-id=858 bgcolor=#fefefe
| 547858 ||  || — || November 27, 2010 || Mount Lemmon || Mount Lemmon Survey ||  || align=right data-sort-value="0.52" | 520 m || 
|-id=859 bgcolor=#E9E9E9
| 547859 ||  || — || November 14, 2010 || Kitt Peak || Spacewatch ||  || align=right | 2.0 km || 
|-id=860 bgcolor=#fefefe
| 547860 ||  || — || November 27, 2010 || Mount Lemmon || Mount Lemmon Survey ||  || align=right data-sort-value="0.82" | 820 m || 
|-id=861 bgcolor=#E9E9E9
| 547861 ||  || — || October 6, 2005 || Mount Lemmon || Mount Lemmon Survey ||  || align=right | 1.7 km || 
|-id=862 bgcolor=#fefefe
| 547862 ||  || — || November 14, 2010 || Catalina || CSS ||  || align=right data-sort-value="0.56" | 560 m || 
|-id=863 bgcolor=#d6d6d6
| 547863 ||  || — || November 13, 2010 || Kitt Peak || Spacewatch ||  || align=right | 2.7 km || 
|-id=864 bgcolor=#d6d6d6
| 547864 ||  || — || October 15, 2001 || Palomar || NEAT || 3:2 || align=right | 6.4 km || 
|-id=865 bgcolor=#E9E9E9
| 547865 ||  || — || January 27, 2007 || Kitt Peak || Spacewatch ||  || align=right | 1.8 km || 
|-id=866 bgcolor=#d6d6d6
| 547866 ||  || — || November 27, 2010 || Mount Lemmon || Mount Lemmon Survey ||  || align=right | 2.6 km || 
|-id=867 bgcolor=#E9E9E9
| 547867 ||  || — || March 29, 2008 || Kitt Peak || Spacewatch ||  || align=right | 1.9 km || 
|-id=868 bgcolor=#E9E9E9
| 547868 ||  || — || October 11, 2005 || Kitt Peak || Spacewatch ||  || align=right | 2.0 km || 
|-id=869 bgcolor=#E9E9E9
| 547869 ||  || — || December 21, 2006 || Kitt Peak || L. H. Wasserman ||  || align=right | 2.0 km || 
|-id=870 bgcolor=#fefefe
| 547870 ||  || — || November 14, 2010 || Kitt Peak || Spacewatch ||  || align=right data-sort-value="0.57" | 570 m || 
|-id=871 bgcolor=#fefefe
| 547871 ||  || — || November 14, 2010 || Kitt Peak || Spacewatch ||  || align=right data-sort-value="0.65" | 650 m || 
|-id=872 bgcolor=#E9E9E9
| 547872 ||  || — || December 14, 2001 || Socorro || LINEAR ||  || align=right | 2.4 km || 
|-id=873 bgcolor=#fefefe
| 547873 ||  || — || November 27, 2010 || Mount Lemmon || Mount Lemmon Survey ||  || align=right data-sort-value="0.65" | 650 m || 
|-id=874 bgcolor=#d6d6d6
| 547874 ||  || — || November 27, 2010 || Mount Lemmon || Mount Lemmon Survey ||  || align=right | 2.4 km || 
|-id=875 bgcolor=#E9E9E9
| 547875 ||  || — || September 30, 2005 || Mount Lemmon || Mount Lemmon Survey ||  || align=right | 1.8 km || 
|-id=876 bgcolor=#E9E9E9
| 547876 ||  || — || November 27, 2010 || Mount Lemmon || Mount Lemmon Survey ||  || align=right | 2.1 km || 
|-id=877 bgcolor=#E9E9E9
| 547877 ||  || — || April 29, 2003 || Kitt Peak || Spacewatch ||  || align=right | 2.0 km || 
|-id=878 bgcolor=#fefefe
| 547878 ||  || — || October 19, 2003 || Kitt Peak || Spacewatch ||  || align=right data-sort-value="0.98" | 980 m || 
|-id=879 bgcolor=#d6d6d6
| 547879 ||  || — || November 6, 2005 || Mount Lemmon || Mount Lemmon Survey ||  || align=right | 1.8 km || 
|-id=880 bgcolor=#d6d6d6
| 547880 ||  || — || November 26, 2005 || Kitt Peak || Spacewatch ||  || align=right | 2.9 km || 
|-id=881 bgcolor=#E9E9E9
| 547881 ||  || — || September 11, 2005 || Kitt Peak || Spacewatch ||  || align=right | 1.9 km || 
|-id=882 bgcolor=#d6d6d6
| 547882 ||  || — || November 2, 2010 || Kitt Peak || Spacewatch ||  || align=right | 2.2 km || 
|-id=883 bgcolor=#fefefe
| 547883 ||  || — || July 24, 2003 || Palomar || NEAT ||  || align=right data-sort-value="0.82" | 820 m || 
|-id=884 bgcolor=#C2FFFF
| 547884 ||  || — || July 15, 2004 || Cerro Tololo || Cerro Tololo Obs. || L4 || align=right | 8.5 km || 
|-id=885 bgcolor=#E9E9E9
| 547885 ||  || — || September 30, 2005 || Anderson Mesa || LONEOS ||  || align=right | 2.0 km || 
|-id=886 bgcolor=#d6d6d6
| 547886 ||  || — || November 30, 2010 || Mount Lemmon || Mount Lemmon Survey ||  || align=right | 2.4 km || 
|-id=887 bgcolor=#fefefe
| 547887 ||  || — || April 9, 2002 || Palomar || NEAT ||  || align=right data-sort-value="0.75" | 750 m || 
|-id=888 bgcolor=#C2FFFF
| 547888 ||  || — || September 22, 2009 || Mount Lemmon || Mount Lemmon Survey || L4 || align=right | 7.8 km || 
|-id=889 bgcolor=#E9E9E9
| 547889 ||  || — || November 30, 2010 || Mount Lemmon || Mount Lemmon Survey ||  || align=right | 2.4 km || 
|-id=890 bgcolor=#E9E9E9
| 547890 ||  || — || July 30, 2005 || Palomar || NEAT ||  || align=right | 2.1 km || 
|-id=891 bgcolor=#E9E9E9
| 547891 ||  || — || October 8, 2005 || Kitt Peak || Spacewatch ||  || align=right | 1.5 km || 
|-id=892 bgcolor=#fefefe
| 547892 ||  || — || February 14, 2005 || Kitt Peak || Spacewatch ||  || align=right data-sort-value="0.66" | 660 m || 
|-id=893 bgcolor=#C2E0FF
| 547893 ||  || — || September 28, 2010 || Haleakala || Pan-STARRS || other TNO || align=right | 321 km || 
|-id=894 bgcolor=#E9E9E9
| 547894 ||  || — || August 20, 2014 || Haleakala || Pan-STARRS ||  || align=right | 2.2 km || 
|-id=895 bgcolor=#E9E9E9
| 547895 ||  || — || January 17, 2007 || Kitt Peak || Spacewatch ||  || align=right | 1.9 km || 
|-id=896 bgcolor=#d6d6d6
| 547896 ||  || — || November 12, 2010 || Mount Lemmon || Mount Lemmon Survey ||  || align=right | 2.4 km || 
|-id=897 bgcolor=#E9E9E9
| 547897 ||  || — || January 23, 2007 || Kanab || E. E. Sheridan || GEF || align=right | 1.4 km || 
|-id=898 bgcolor=#d6d6d6
| 547898 ||  || — || December 2, 2010 || Mount Lemmon || Mount Lemmon Survey ||  || align=right | 2.2 km || 
|-id=899 bgcolor=#d6d6d6
| 547899 ||  || — || December 2, 2010 || Mount Lemmon || Mount Lemmon Survey || BRA || align=right | 1.4 km || 
|-id=900 bgcolor=#fefefe
| 547900 ||  || — || December 3, 2010 || Mount Lemmon || Mount Lemmon Survey ||  || align=right data-sort-value="0.52" | 520 m || 
|}

547901–548000 

|-bgcolor=#E9E9E9
| 547901 ||  || — || December 3, 2010 || Mount Lemmon || Mount Lemmon Survey ||  || align=right | 1.9 km || 
|-id=902 bgcolor=#E9E9E9
| 547902 ||  || — || April 1, 2008 || Kitt Peak || Spacewatch ||  || align=right | 1.9 km || 
|-id=903 bgcolor=#E9E9E9
| 547903 ||  || — || April 29, 2008 || Mount Lemmon || Mount Lemmon Survey ||  || align=right | 1.8 km || 
|-id=904 bgcolor=#E9E9E9
| 547904 ||  || — || October 1, 2005 || Kitt Peak || Spacewatch ||  || align=right | 1.9 km || 
|-id=905 bgcolor=#fefefe
| 547905 ||  || — || December 18, 2007 || Kitt Peak || Spacewatch ||  || align=right data-sort-value="0.58" | 580 m || 
|-id=906 bgcolor=#d6d6d6
| 547906 ||  || — || November 13, 2010 || Kitt Peak || Spacewatch ||  || align=right | 2.3 km || 
|-id=907 bgcolor=#E9E9E9
| 547907 ||  || — || November 12, 2010 || Mount Lemmon || Mount Lemmon Survey ||  || align=right | 2.4 km || 
|-id=908 bgcolor=#fefefe
| 547908 ||  || — || October 31, 2010 || Kitt Peak || Spacewatch ||  || align=right data-sort-value="0.75" | 750 m || 
|-id=909 bgcolor=#d6d6d6
| 547909 ||  || — || December 2, 2010 || Mount Lemmon || Mount Lemmon Survey ||  || align=right | 2.2 km || 
|-id=910 bgcolor=#E9E9E9
| 547910 ||  || — || September 3, 2005 || Catalina || CSS ||  || align=right | 2.3 km || 
|-id=911 bgcolor=#E9E9E9
| 547911 ||  || — || April 9, 2003 || Palomar || NEAT ||  || align=right | 1.8 km || 
|-id=912 bgcolor=#d6d6d6
| 547912 ||  || — || November 22, 2005 || Kitt Peak || Spacewatch ||  || align=right | 2.6 km || 
|-id=913 bgcolor=#E9E9E9
| 547913 ||  || — || December 3, 2010 || Mount Lemmon || Mount Lemmon Survey ||  || align=right | 2.0 km || 
|-id=914 bgcolor=#E9E9E9
| 547914 ||  || — || November 25, 2005 || Catalina || CSS ||  || align=right | 2.8 km || 
|-id=915 bgcolor=#d6d6d6
| 547915 ||  || — || December 5, 2010 || Kitt Peak || Spacewatch ||  || align=right | 2.1 km || 
|-id=916 bgcolor=#fefefe
| 547916 ||  || — || December 5, 2007 || Mount Lemmon || Mount Lemmon Survey ||  || align=right data-sort-value="0.56" | 560 m || 
|-id=917 bgcolor=#E9E9E9
| 547917 ||  || — || July 30, 2005 || Palomar || NEAT ||  || align=right | 2.5 km || 
|-id=918 bgcolor=#d6d6d6
| 547918 ||  || — || January 7, 2006 || Mount Lemmon || Mount Lemmon Survey ||  || align=right | 2.2 km || 
|-id=919 bgcolor=#d6d6d6
| 547919 ||  || — || November 9, 2004 || Catalina || CSS || EOS || align=right | 2.9 km || 
|-id=920 bgcolor=#d6d6d6
| 547920 ||  || — || December 11, 2010 || Mount Lemmon || Mount Lemmon Survey ||  || align=right | 2.9 km || 
|-id=921 bgcolor=#E9E9E9
| 547921 ||  || — || December 8, 2010 || Kitt Peak || Spacewatch ||  || align=right | 2.2 km || 
|-id=922 bgcolor=#d6d6d6
| 547922 ||  || — || December 15, 2010 || Mount Lemmon || Mount Lemmon Survey ||  || align=right | 2.2 km || 
|-id=923 bgcolor=#d6d6d6
| 547923 ||  || — || November 8, 2010 || Mount Lemmon || Mount Lemmon Survey ||  || align=right | 3.2 km || 
|-id=924 bgcolor=#fefefe
| 547924 ||  || — || January 1, 2008 || Kitt Peak || Spacewatch ||  || align=right data-sort-value="0.54" | 540 m || 
|-id=925 bgcolor=#E9E9E9
| 547925 ||  || — || December 4, 2010 || Mount Lemmon || Mount Lemmon Survey ||  || align=right | 1.9 km || 
|-id=926 bgcolor=#d6d6d6
| 547926 ||  || — || August 16, 2009 || Kitt Peak || Spacewatch ||  || align=right | 2.1 km || 
|-id=927 bgcolor=#fefefe
| 547927 ||  || — || November 10, 2010 || Mount Lemmon || Mount Lemmon Survey ||  || align=right data-sort-value="0.59" | 590 m || 
|-id=928 bgcolor=#E9E9E9
| 547928 ||  || — || March 25, 2003 || Kitt Peak || Spacewatch ||  || align=right | 2.8 km || 
|-id=929 bgcolor=#d6d6d6
| 547929 ||  || — || December 14, 2010 || Mount Lemmon || Mount Lemmon Survey ||  || align=right | 3.1 km || 
|-id=930 bgcolor=#d6d6d6
| 547930 ||  || — || October 12, 2010 || Kitt Peak || Spacewatch ||  || align=right | 2.8 km || 
|-id=931 bgcolor=#d6d6d6
| 547931 ||  || — || September 19, 2003 || Palomar || NEAT ||  || align=right | 3.5 km || 
|-id=932 bgcolor=#E9E9E9
| 547932 ||  || — || December 3, 2010 || Mount Lemmon || Mount Lemmon Survey ||  || align=right | 2.0 km || 
|-id=933 bgcolor=#d6d6d6
| 547933 ||  || — || December 14, 2010 || Mount Lemmon || Mount Lemmon Survey ||  || align=right | 1.5 km || 
|-id=934 bgcolor=#d6d6d6
| 547934 ||  || — || December 14, 2010 || Mount Lemmon || Mount Lemmon Survey ||  || align=right | 3.2 km || 
|-id=935 bgcolor=#E9E9E9
| 547935 ||  || — || December 3, 2010 || Mount Lemmon || Mount Lemmon Survey ||  || align=right | 2.6 km || 
|-id=936 bgcolor=#fefefe
| 547936 ||  || — || November 20, 2003 || Socorro || LINEAR ||  || align=right data-sort-value="0.65" | 650 m || 
|-id=937 bgcolor=#E9E9E9
| 547937 ||  || — || December 4, 2010 || Mount Lemmon || Mount Lemmon Survey ||  || align=right | 2.4 km || 
|-id=938 bgcolor=#E9E9E9
| 547938 ||  || — || November 23, 2014 || Haleakala || Pan-STARRS ||  || align=right | 1.8 km || 
|-id=939 bgcolor=#d6d6d6
| 547939 ||  || — || December 10, 2010 || Mount Lemmon || Mount Lemmon Survey ||  || align=right | 2.8 km || 
|-id=940 bgcolor=#d6d6d6
| 547940 ||  || — || August 20, 2014 || Haleakala || Pan-STARRS ||  || align=right | 2.4 km || 
|-id=941 bgcolor=#fefefe
| 547941 ||  || — || December 11, 2010 || Mount Lemmon || Mount Lemmon Survey || H || align=right data-sort-value="0.62" | 620 m || 
|-id=942 bgcolor=#d6d6d6
| 547942 ||  || — || September 4, 2014 || Haleakala || Pan-STARRS ||  || align=right | 2.5 km || 
|-id=943 bgcolor=#E9E9E9
| 547943 ||  || — || July 31, 2014 || Haleakala || Pan-STARRS ||  || align=right | 2.0 km || 
|-id=944 bgcolor=#d6d6d6
| 547944 ||  || — || July 25, 2014 || Haleakala || Pan-STARRS ||  || align=right | 2.9 km || 
|-id=945 bgcolor=#d6d6d6
| 547945 ||  || — || December 8, 2010 || Kitt Peak || Spacewatch ||  || align=right | 1.3 km || 
|-id=946 bgcolor=#E9E9E9
| 547946 ||  || — || December 2, 2010 || Mount Lemmon || Mount Lemmon Survey ||  || align=right | 2.0 km || 
|-id=947 bgcolor=#d6d6d6
| 547947 ||  || — || December 8, 2010 || Kitt Peak || Spacewatch ||  || align=right | 2.4 km || 
|-id=948 bgcolor=#d6d6d6
| 547948 ||  || — || January 28, 2017 || Haleakala || Pan-STARRS ||  || align=right | 2.8 km || 
|-id=949 bgcolor=#d6d6d6
| 547949 ||  || — || February 21, 2012 || Mount Lemmon || Mount Lemmon Survey ||  || align=right | 2.1 km || 
|-id=950 bgcolor=#d6d6d6
| 547950 ||  || — || December 9, 2010 || Mount Lemmon || Mount Lemmon Survey ||  || align=right | 1.5 km || 
|-id=951 bgcolor=#d6d6d6
| 547951 ||  || — || June 26, 2014 || Haleakala || Pan-STARRS ||  || align=right | 2.2 km || 
|-id=952 bgcolor=#d6d6d6
| 547952 ||  || — || December 3, 2010 || Mount Lemmon || Mount Lemmon Survey ||  || align=right | 1.9 km || 
|-id=953 bgcolor=#E9E9E9
| 547953 ||  || — || December 4, 2010 || Mount Lemmon || Mount Lemmon Survey ||  || align=right | 1.5 km || 
|-id=954 bgcolor=#fefefe
| 547954 ||  || — || December 2, 2010 || Mount Lemmon || Mount Lemmon Survey ||  || align=right data-sort-value="0.54" | 540 m || 
|-id=955 bgcolor=#fefefe
| 547955 ||  || — || December 14, 2010 || Mount Lemmon || Mount Lemmon Survey ||  || align=right data-sort-value="0.66" | 660 m || 
|-id=956 bgcolor=#fefefe
| 547956 ||  || — || December 4, 2010 || Mount Lemmon || Mount Lemmon Survey ||  || align=right data-sort-value="0.52" | 520 m || 
|-id=957 bgcolor=#C2FFFF
| 547957 ||  || — || December 3, 2010 || Mount Lemmon || Mount Lemmon Survey || L4 || align=right | 7.5 km || 
|-id=958 bgcolor=#fefefe
| 547958 ||  || — || December 2, 2010 || Mount Lemmon || Mount Lemmon Survey ||  || align=right data-sort-value="0.59" | 590 m || 
|-id=959 bgcolor=#E9E9E9
| 547959 ||  || — || December 10, 2010 || Mount Lemmon || Mount Lemmon Survey ||  || align=right | 1.2 km || 
|-id=960 bgcolor=#fefefe
| 547960 ||  || — || December 14, 2010 || Mount Lemmon || Mount Lemmon Survey ||  || align=right data-sort-value="0.52" | 520 m || 
|-id=961 bgcolor=#fefefe
| 547961 ||  || — || December 6, 2010 || Kitt Peak || Spacewatch ||  || align=right data-sort-value="0.86" | 860 m || 
|-id=962 bgcolor=#fefefe
| 547962 ||  || — || November 25, 2000 || Kitt Peak || Spacewatch ||  || align=right data-sort-value="0.96" | 960 m || 
|-id=963 bgcolor=#d6d6d6
| 547963 ||  || — || December 30, 2010 || Piszkesteto || Z. Kuli, K. Sárneczky ||  || align=right | 2.6 km || 
|-id=964 bgcolor=#fefefe
| 547964 ||  || — || December 30, 2010 || Piszkesteto || Z. Kuli, K. Sárneczky ||  || align=right data-sort-value="0.68" | 680 m || 
|-id=965 bgcolor=#fefefe
| 547965 ||  || — || December 14, 2010 || Catalina || CSS ||  || align=right | 1.3 km || 
|-id=966 bgcolor=#fefefe
| 547966 ||  || — || December 8, 2010 || Mount Lemmon || Mount Lemmon Survey || H || align=right data-sort-value="0.68" | 680 m || 
|-id=967 bgcolor=#d6d6d6
| 547967 ||  || — || January 6, 2010 || Kitt Peak || Spacewatch ||  || align=right | 1.9 km || 
|-id=968 bgcolor=#fefefe
| 547968 ||  || — || January 12, 1996 || Kitt Peak || Spacewatch ||  || align=right data-sort-value="0.86" | 860 m || 
|-id=969 bgcolor=#d6d6d6
| 547969 ||  || — || January 6, 2010 || Kitt Peak || Spacewatch ||  || align=right | 2.3 km || 
|-id=970 bgcolor=#d6d6d6
| 547970 ||  || — || July 30, 2008 || Mount Lemmon || Mount Lemmon Survey ||  || align=right | 2.5 km || 
|-id=971 bgcolor=#d6d6d6
| 547971 ||  || — || January 6, 2010 || Mount Lemmon || Mount Lemmon Survey ||  || align=right | 2.9 km || 
|-id=972 bgcolor=#fefefe
| 547972 ||  || — || September 26, 2005 || Palomar || NEAT || V || align=right data-sort-value="0.71" | 710 m || 
|-id=973 bgcolor=#d6d6d6
| 547973 ||  || — || November 23, 2009 || Mount Lemmon || Mount Lemmon Survey ||  || align=right | 2.2 km || 
|-id=974 bgcolor=#E9E9E9
| 547974 ||  || — || December 20, 2009 || Mount Lemmon || Mount Lemmon Survey ||  || align=right data-sort-value="0.70" | 700 m || 
|-id=975 bgcolor=#fefefe
| 547975 ||  || — || December 18, 2009 || Mount Lemmon || Mount Lemmon Survey ||  || align=right data-sort-value="0.75" | 750 m || 
|-id=976 bgcolor=#d6d6d6
| 547976 ||  || — || December 15, 2009 || Mount Lemmon || Mount Lemmon Survey ||  || align=right | 3.4 km || 
|-id=977 bgcolor=#fefefe
| 547977 ||  || — || January 30, 2003 || Anderson Mesa || LONEOS ||  || align=right data-sort-value="0.84" | 840 m || 
|-id=978 bgcolor=#d6d6d6
| 547978 ||  || — || October 9, 2008 || Mount Lemmon || Mount Lemmon Survey ||  || align=right | 2.4 km || 
|-id=979 bgcolor=#d6d6d6
| 547979 ||  || — || December 20, 2004 || Mount Lemmon || Mount Lemmon Survey ||  || align=right | 2.2 km || 
|-id=980 bgcolor=#d6d6d6
| 547980 ||  || — || December 20, 2009 || Mount Lemmon || Mount Lemmon Survey ||  || align=right | 2.3 km || 
|-id=981 bgcolor=#fefefe
| 547981 ||  || — || December 19, 2009 || Kitt Peak || Spacewatch ||  || align=right data-sort-value="0.78" | 780 m || 
|-id=982 bgcolor=#fefefe
| 547982 ||  || — || January 6, 2010 || Mount Lemmon || Mount Lemmon Survey ||  || align=right data-sort-value="0.65" | 650 m || 
|-id=983 bgcolor=#fefefe
| 547983 ||  || — || December 25, 2009 || Kitt Peak || Spacewatch ||  || align=right data-sort-value="0.82" | 820 m || 
|-id=984 bgcolor=#d6d6d6
| 547984 ||  || — || November 21, 2009 || Mount Lemmon || Mount Lemmon Survey ||  || align=right | 3.7 km || 
|-id=985 bgcolor=#fefefe
| 547985 ||  || — || October 31, 2005 || Catalina || CSS ||  || align=right data-sort-value="0.82" | 820 m || 
|-id=986 bgcolor=#d6d6d6
| 547986 ||  || — || January 6, 2010 || Kitt Peak || Spacewatch ||  || align=right | 2.8 km || 
|-id=987 bgcolor=#fefefe
| 547987 ||  || — || January 7, 2010 || Kitt Peak || Spacewatch ||  || align=right data-sort-value="0.86" | 860 m || 
|-id=988 bgcolor=#d6d6d6
| 547988 ||  || — || January 7, 2010 || Kitt Peak || Spacewatch ||  || align=right | 2.8 km || 
|-id=989 bgcolor=#E9E9E9
| 547989 ||  || — || January 30, 2006 || Catalina || CSS ||  || align=right data-sort-value="0.83" | 830 m || 
|-id=990 bgcolor=#d6d6d6
| 547990 ||  || — || January 6, 2010 || Kitt Peak || Spacewatch ||  || align=right | 2.6 km || 
|-id=991 bgcolor=#fefefe
| 547991 ||  || — || March 14, 2007 || Mount Lemmon || Mount Lemmon Survey ||  || align=right data-sort-value="0.71" | 710 m || 
|-id=992 bgcolor=#d6d6d6
| 547992 ||  || — || December 10, 2009 || Mount Lemmon || Mount Lemmon Survey ||  || align=right | 2.1 km || 
|-id=993 bgcolor=#fefefe
| 547993 ||  || — || January 7, 2010 || Mount Lemmon || Mount Lemmon Survey ||  || align=right data-sort-value="0.80" | 800 m || 
|-id=994 bgcolor=#d6d6d6
| 547994 ||  || — || January 8, 2010 || Kitt Peak || Spacewatch ||  || align=right | 3.2 km || 
|-id=995 bgcolor=#d6d6d6
| 547995 ||  || — || January 8, 2010 || Kitt Peak || Spacewatch ||  || align=right | 2.5 km || 
|-id=996 bgcolor=#d6d6d6
| 547996 ||  || — || October 7, 2008 || Mount Lemmon || Mount Lemmon Survey ||  || align=right | 3.2 km || 
|-id=997 bgcolor=#d6d6d6
| 547997 ||  || — || January 11, 2010 || Mount Lemmon || Mount Lemmon Survey ||  || align=right | 2.0 km || 
|-id=998 bgcolor=#d6d6d6
| 547998 ||  || — || December 18, 2004 || Mount Lemmon || Mount Lemmon Survey ||  || align=right | 2.5 km || 
|-id=999 bgcolor=#E9E9E9
| 547999 ||  || — || January 10, 2010 || Kitt Peak || Spacewatch ||  || align=right | 1.4 km || 
|-id=000 bgcolor=#d6d6d6
| 548000 ||  || — || January 11, 2010 || Kitt Peak || Spacewatch ||  || align=right | 2.9 km || 
|}

References

External links 
 Discovery Circumstances: Numbered Minor Planets (545001)–(550000) (IAU Minor Planet Center)

0547